= Emperor Taizong's campaign against Xueyantuo =

War in China

Date	641–646
Location	Mongolia, regions around Lake Baikal
Result	Tang victory: Fall of Xueyantuo
Territorial changes	Outer Mongolia and the regions around Lake Baikal added into the Tang Empire

Belligerents
Tang dynasty	Tiele Khaganate

Commanders and leaders
Emperor Taizong of Tang; Li Shiji; Qiao Shiwang; Zhishi Sili; Li Daozong; Ashina She'er; Qibi Heli; Xue Wanche; Zhang Jian; Ashina Simo; Yaoluoge Tumidu	Zhenzhu Khan; Dadu; Bazhuo †; Duomozhi (POW)

Casualties and losses
Thousands	At least 3,000 dead, 2,000 captured, 5,000 horses captured

Early in his reign Emperor Taizong of Tang (r. 626–649), had allied with Xueyantuo, a vassal of the Eastern Turkic Khaganate, against the Eastern Turks, who the Tang defeated in 630. Upon the Eastern Turks' defeat, the Xueyantuo's Zhenzhu Khan took over the Eastern Turks' former territory, and while he was formally subservient to the Tang, he was expanding his own strength. When Emperor Taizong tried to restore the Eastern Turks in 639 under Qilibi Khan to counteract the rise of Xueyantuo power, the Xueyantuo engaged in multiple battles with the newly restored Eastern Turks, to prevent this return. The major Tang general Li Shiji temporarily came to protect the Eastern Turks against the Xueyantuo and defeated the Xueyantuo forces in 641. But in 644, with Emperor Taizong occupied with a campaign against Goguryeo, Xueyantuo forces launched a new campaign, defeated the Eastern Turks, forcing Qilibi Khan to flee back to the Tang. Subsequently, Goguryeo sought aid from the Xueyantuo, but Zhenzhu avoided further conflict, wanting to avoid direct battle with Tang. After Zhenzhu's death in 645, however, his son Duomi Khan Bazhuo began heavily battling Tang forces. In 646, Tang forces counterattacked, and after they defeated Bazhuo, Xueyantuo's vassal the Uyghurs rose and killed him. His cousin, the Yitewushi Khan Duomozhi, surrendered to Tang forces, ending Xueyantuo.

== Cooperation between the Tang and Xueyantuo under Zhenzhu Khan ==
The Xueyantuo had long been a member tribe of the Chile confederation, which had in turn been subservient to the Göktürks, both before and after the division of Göktürks into Western Turks and Eastern Turks, and in the 600s, the Chile had rebelled against Western Turks' Heshana Qaghan, declaring independence under the leadership of Qibi (契苾) chieftain Geleng (歌楞) (with the title Yiwuzhenmohe Qaghan (易勿真莫賀可汗)) and the Xueyantuo chieftain Yishibo (with the title Yiedie Khan), but later resubmitted to the Western Turks' Shikui Khagan.

At some point, the Chile became subservient to Eastern Turks instead, and as of the reign of Illig Qaghan, the Xueyantuo were ruled by Yiedie Khan's grandson Yi'nan (later Zhenzhu Khan). However, Illig Qaghan was said to be a poor ruler, and by 627, several members of the Chile-Xueyantuo, Uyghurs, and Bayegu (拔野谷) had rebelled. Illig Qaghan tried to send his nephew Yukuk Shad against the Uyghurs, but Yukuk Shad was defeated by the Uyghur chieftain Pusa (菩薩), while the Xueyantuo defeated four other Eastern Turk generals, and Illig Qaghan was not able to resubjugate the Chile rebels. Still, in 628, when these Chile tribes offered the title of khan to Yi'nan, Yi'nan did not initially dare to accept it. However, Emperor Taizong of Tang, hearing this and wanting to establish an alliance with Xueyantuo against Eastern Turks, sent his general Qiao Shiwang (喬師望) to Xueyantuo to make Yi'nan khan as Zhenzhu Khan, and subsequently, a large number of Chile and Turks tribes came under Zhenzhu's rule. Subsequently, the Tang and Xueyantuo often exchanged emissaries, and Xueyantuo grew stronger at the Eastern Turks' expense.

In 629, Emperor Taizong commissioned the general Li Jing to lead a major expedition against the Eastern Turks, and in 630, Li Jing captured Illig Qaghan and effectively destroyed the Eastern Turks. Much of the Eastern Turks' people surrendered to the Xueyantuo, and some surrendered to the Tang. After this the Xueyantuo were the predominant power north of China, but remained formally subservient to the Tang. In 638, Emperor Taizong, with Zhenzhu's concurrence, made Zhenzhu's sons Bazhuo (later Duomi Khan) and Jialibi (頡利苾) subordinate khans under Zhenzhu–ostensibly to honor them, but hoping to create dissension between them. In 639, when Emperor Taizong commissioned the general Hou Junji to launch a campaign against Gaochang, Zhenzhu offered to attack Gaochang at the same time, although Hou's quick conquest of Gaochang appeared to involve no Xueyantuo aid.

== Conflict of 641 ==
After Illig Qaghan's capture, Emperor Taizong had settled the Eastern Turkic people who surrendered to the Tang within Tang borders, without creating a new khan to govern them. However, after Emperor Taizong (Note: See Cambridge History of China, vol.3, p.231) was nearly assassinated by Illig Qaghan's nephew Ashina Jiesheshuai in 639, Emperor Taizong changed his mind and made an Eastern Turkic prince loyal to the Tang, Ashina Simo, the new khan of Eastern Turks as Qilibi Khan, intending to settle his state south of the Gobi Desert to serve as a buffer between the Tang and Xueyantuo. Zhenzhu Khan was distressed by the development, but initially indicated that he accepted it.

As of 641, Qilibi had finally marched north of the Great Wall and settled in at Dingxiang (定襄, in modern Hohhot, Inner Mongolia). Meanwhile, Zhenzhu had heard that Emperor Taizong was about to offer sacrifices to heaven and earth at Mount Tai and, believing that the Tang troops would all be with Emperor Taizong, had his son Dadu (大度) launch a major attack on the Eastern Turks, intending to destroy Qilibi before the Tang could render aid. Qilibi withdrew within the Great Wall and took up position at Shuo Prefecture (roughly modern Shuozhou, Shanxi) and sought emergency aid from the Tang. Emperor Taizong sent the general Li Shiji, assisted by the generals Zhang Jian (張儉), Li Daliang, Zhang Shigui (張士貴), and Li Xiyu (李襲譽), to attack the Xueyantuo. Li Shiji engaged Dadu first and defeated him, forcing him to flee. Meanwhile, Zhenzhu had sent an emissary to Emperor Taizong to offer peace to the Eastern Turks, and Li Shiji prevailed over Dadu, Emperor Taizong sent the emissary back with a rebuke for Zhenzhu but did not further take actions against the Xueyantuo, and thereafter, the relationship between the Tang and Xueyantuo officially remained that of lord and vassal, but appeared to be no longer as strong as it had been.

== Later years of Zhenzhu Khan's reign ==
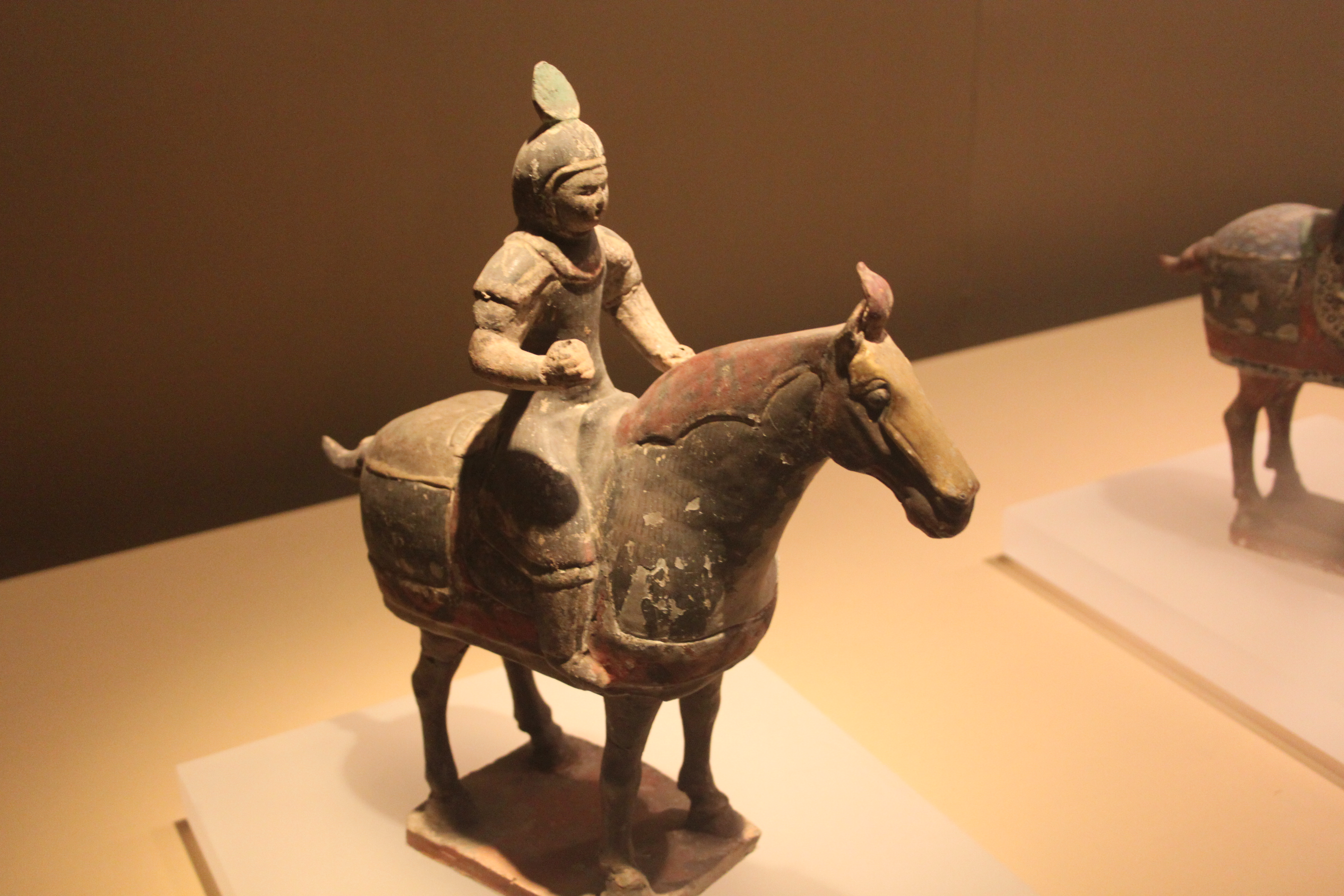
Armoured cavalry figurine, Tang dynasty

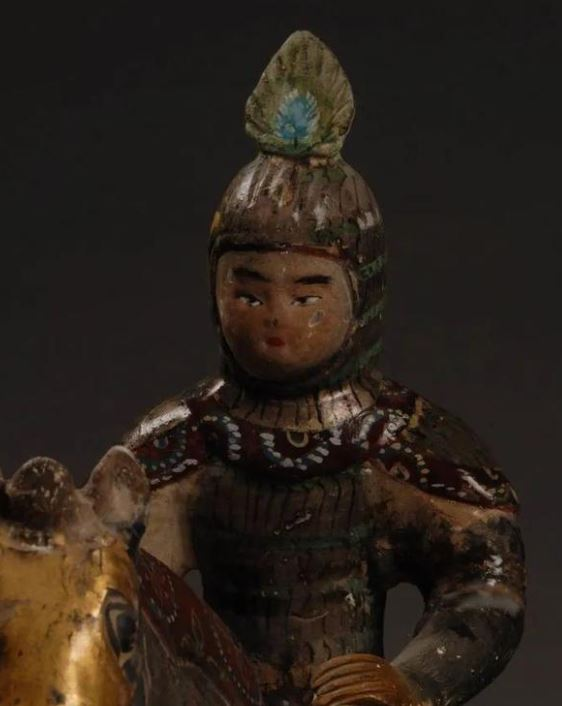
Close up of cavalry figurine's front

In 642, Zhenzhu Khan began an attempt to cement his relationship with the Tang by sending his uncle Nishou (泥熟) to the Tang to request marriage with one of Emperor Taizong's daughters, offering tribute of horses, mink coats, and a mirror made of amber. Meanwhile, with the Tang general Qibi Heli (契苾何力) – the chief of the Qibi tribe, a constituent tribe of the Chile as well – being detained by the Xueyantuo after he, on a visit back to his tribe, was seized by his own subordinates and taken to the Xueyantuo (as his subordinates wanted to submit to the Xueyantuo rather than the Tang), Emperor Taizong, concerned about Qibi Heli's safety (as Qibi Heli had refused to submit to the Xueyantuo, cutting off an ear to show his resolve, causing Zhenzhu to nearly execute him), agreed to the marriage proposal, sending the official Cui Dunli to negotiate the terms with Zhenzhu, under which Emperor Taizong's daughter Princess Xinxing would marry Zhenzhu, in exchange for Qibi Heli's release.

In 643, Zhenzhu again sent his nephew Tuli (突利) to offer tribute of 50,000 horses, 10,000 cattle or camels, and 100,000 goats, to serve as a bride price. Emperor Taizong welcomed Tuli in a grand ceremony, and Tuli held a great banquet in Emperor Taizong's honor, which Emperor Taizong and his officials personally attended. However, at Qibi's urging, Emperor Taizong was considering renouncing the marriage, initially ordering Zhenzhu to personally meet him and Princess Xinxing at Ling Prefecture (靈州, roughly modern Yinchuan, Ningxia) to marry her, believing that Zhenzhu would refuse and that he would then have a good excuse to break off the marriage. When Zhenzhu agreed to go to Ling Prefecture, Emperor Taizong found another excuse that the bride price offered had not been all collected (as, in order to gather the livestock making up the bride price, Zhenzhu had to collect them from subordinate tribes, and it was taking longer than thought, and the livestock were also dying from having to go through the Gobi) to cancel the marriage treaty, despite strong opposition from his official Chu Suiliang, who pointed out that, effectively, he was devaluing his own words. Emperor Taizong rationalized his decision by arguing that if Zhenzhu had married a Tang princess, he would have greater legitimacy over the Chile tribes and would be more difficult to control.

Meanwhile, Zhenzhu was continuing to attack the Eastern Turks periodically. When Emperor Taizong sent emissaries to try to stop him from doing so, Zhenzhu responded:

How do I not dare to follow the emperor's edict? But the Turkic people are treacherous and should not be trusted. Before the destruction of their state, they invaded China each year and continued to kill thousands of people. I thought that, after the emperor defeated them, he would make them into slaves and reward them to the Chinese people, but instead the emperor raised them like his own sons and showed much grace to them. Despite this, Ashina Jiesheshuai rebelled. They look like humans, but have hearts like beasts, and should not be treated as humans. I have received much grace from the emperor, and I have nothing to repay him for. I am willing to kill the Turks for China.

By the end of 644, the Eastern Turkic people, who were not whole-heartedly supportive of Qilibi Khan in the first place, collapsed in light of the Xueyantuo threat, fleeing back to Tang territory, and were again settled there. Qilibi also went back to the Tang and again became a Tang general, ending the Tang's attempt to recreate the Eastern Turks as a vassal state. This displeased Emperor Taizong, and when Zhenzhu subsequently sent an emissary to offer tribute to Emperor Taizong, who was at that time deeply into preparation to attack Goguryeo, Emperor Taizong responded, "Go back and tell your khan: My son and I are now about to attack Goguryeo. If he thinks that he can take advantage of this, he is welcome to come!" Zhenzhu, fearful of Emperor Taizong's anger, sent another emissary to apologize and offering to assist in the operation against Goguryeo, an offer that Emperor Taizong declined. In 645, after Emperor Taizong had defeated the main Goguryeo forces, Goguryeo's mangniji (regent) Yŏn Kaesomun requested that Zhenzhu attack the Tang, offering great tribute to him if he did. Zhenzhu, fearful of Tang power, did not do so.

== Zhenzhu Khan's death and the Xueyantuo's collapse ==
Zhenzhu Khan died in 645. It was described that at this time, Bazhuo, born of Zhenzhu's wife, was governing the western part of Xueyantuo, over the Xueyantuo people, while another son of Zhenzhu, Yemang (曳莽), who was older but not born of Zhenzhu's wife, was governing the eastern part of the Xueyantuo, governing the various tribes. Yemang was said to be violent and disturbed, and also had a bad relationship with Bazhuo. After the funeral, Yemang, fearing that Bazhuo would harm him, left suddenly to return to the eastern part of the khanate. Bazhuo chased him down and killed him, and then took the throne with the title of Duomi Khan.

Duomi decided to attack the Tang, believing that with Emperor Taizong on a campaign against Goguryeo, that Tang borders would be undefended. However, Emperor Taizong, anticipating the possibility of a Xueyantuo attack, had had the general Zhishi Sili (執失思力) command Turkic soldiers to defend Xia Prefecture (夏州, roughly modern Yulin, Shaanxi). Once Duomi attacked, Zhishi Sili and another general, Tian Renhui (田仁會), set a trap to induce Duomi to attack Xia Prefecture, and dealt him a defeat once he was at Xia Prefecture. Duomi withdrew, but soon attacked Xia Prefecture again.

Briefly after the new year 646, Emperor Taizong ordered, in addition to Zhishi and Tian's troops, for troops to be mobilized under the generals Li Daozong the Prince of Jiangxia, Xue Wanche (薛萬徹), Ashina She'er (阿史那社爾), Song Junming (宋君明), and Xue Guwu (薛孤吳), to defend against Duomi's attack, which Duomi called off after reaching the Great Wall and realizing that Tang forces had been mobilized. In turn, in the spring of 646, Zhishi and Qiao Shiwang counterattacked, defeating Duomi and forcing him to flee, throwing the Xueyantuo into a state of confusion.

Meanwhile, it was said that Duomi was intolerant and ill-tempered, as well as suspicious. He removed Zhenzhu's chief advisors and replaced them with people close to him, which led to the nobles despising him and he responded by killing a large number of them, throwing the Xueyantuo court into terror. Yaoluoge Tumidu (藥羅葛吐迷度), the chieftain of the Uyghurs, then a Xueyantuo vassal, rebelled along with the Pugu (僕骨) and Tongluo (同羅) tribes and dealt Duomi a great defeat. Emperor Taizong took the chance to order a major assault against Xueyantuo proper by Li, Ashina, Zhishi, Qibi Heli, Xue Wanche, and Zhang Jian. As the assault was beginning, by chance a Tang officer, Yuwen Fa (宇文法), was serving as an emissary to the Wuluohu (烏羅護) and the Mohe and returning to the Tang, when he encountered the Xueyantuo general Abo (阿波). Yuwen attacked Abo with the Mohe troops with him at the time and defeated Abo, which led to even greater confusion for Xueyantuo, whose people believed that the main Tang army had already arrived. In panic, Duomi fled to the vassal Ashide tribe, and when Uyghur forces heard this, they attacked and killed Duomi, killing any Xueyantuo imperial clan members they could find. Many Xueyantuo generals surrendered to the Tang.

The remaining Xueyantuo people briefly supported Zhenzhu's nephew Duomozhi as Yitewushi Khan to try to revive Xueyantuo, but neither the Tang nor the Chile tribes welcomed this development, and Emperor Taizong sent Li Shiji with an army toward Duomozhi's location with the instruction to accept Yitewushi's surrender if he wanted to surrender, and to attack if he did not. Li Shiji soon arrived at the Khangai, and Yitewushi's assistant Tizhen (梯真) surrendered. Yitewushi fled to the south into the canyon. Li Shiji sent his subordinate Xiao Siye (蕭嗣業) to comfort him, and he surrendered to Xiao. Not all of his subordinates were willing to surrender, however, and Li Shiji attacked them, killing and capturing many of them. Yitewushi was taken to the Tang capital Chang'an and made a Tang general, and Xueyantuo was at its end.

== Sources ==
- Zizhi Tongjian, vols. 192, 193, 194, 195, 196, 197, 198.
