= Tiele people =

Confederation of Turkic peoples

Tiele
*Tegreg?

Regions with significant populations
- Northern China, Altai Mountains, Xinjiang (Dzungaria) and the Pontic–Caspian steppe (by 6th century)

Languages
- Turkic

Religion
- Tengrism, Shamanism, Buddhism

Related ethnic groups
- Dingling, Xiongnu, and later Turkic peoples

The Tiele (Chinese: 鐵勒; pinyin: Tiělè), (Note: Chinese: 鐵勒; pinyin: Tiělè, Mongolian *Tegreg "[People of the] Carts") also transliterated as Chile (Chinese: 敕勒), Dili (Chinese: 狄歷), Zhile (Chinese: 直勒) and Tele (Chinese: 特勒), who were also known by the Chinese exonym Gaoche (Chinese: 高車) or Gaoju, (Note: Chinese: 高車, "High Carts") were a tribal confederation of Turkic ethnic origins living to the north of China proper and in Central Asia, emerging after the disintegration of the Xiongnu confederacy. Chinese sources associate them with the earlier Dingling. (Note: Chinese: 丁零)

== Chile and Gaoche ==
The names "Chile" (敕勒) and "Gaoche" (高車) first appear in Chinese records during the campaigns of Former Yan and Dai in 357 and 363 respectively. However, the protagonists were also addressed as "Dingling" in the records of the Southern Dynasties. The name Gaoche ("high cart") was a nickname given by the Chinese.

The Book of Jin, listed Chile as the fifth of 19 Southern Xiongnu tribes. By the time of the Rouran domination, the Gaoche comprised six tribes and twelve clans.

The Gaoche are probably remnants of the ancient Red Di. Initially they had been called Dili. Northerners take them as Chile. Chinese take them as Gaoche Dingling. Their language, in brief, and Xiongnu [language] are the same yet occasionally there are small differences. Or one may say that they [Gaoche] are the junior relatives of the Xiongnu in former times.

The Gaoche migrate in search of grass and water. They dress in skins and eat meat. Their cattle and sheep are just like those of the Rouran, but the wheel of their carts are high and have very many spokes.

— Weishu, 103

The predecessors of Huihe were Xiongnu. Because, customarily, they ride high-wheeled carts. They were also called Gaoche during the Yuan Wei times, or also called Chile, mistakenly rendered as Tiele.

— Xin Tangshu, 232

One group known as the Eastern Gaoche (东部高车) probably dwelled from the Onon River to Lake Baikal. However, their relationship with the rest of the Gaoche and its tribal components is unclear.

=== Mythological origin ===
The Book of Wei preserved the Gaoche's origin myth.

According to legends, the Xiongnu Chanyu had two daughters, both extremely beautiful. The people of the country all thought them to be spirits. The Chanyu said: "How could I find husbands for my daughters! I am going to give them to Heaven." Thereupon, at a desolate place in the north part of the country, he erected a high platform and placed his two daughters on the top, saying: "Oh Heaven, please come and receive them yourself!" After three years, their mother wanted to bring them back but the Chanyu said: "You may not, their time is not up yet." After another year, there was an old wolf who guarded the platform day and night, howling. It dug a hole underneath the platform and would not leave for a long time. The younger daughter said: "Our father put us here, wanting to give us to Heaven. Now this wolf came here, it is probably a heavenly being, sent by Heaven." She was about to descend and approach the wolf but her elder sister said in horror: "This is a beast! Do not bring disgrace to our parents." The younger sister did not listen to her, she descended and became the wolf's wife and gave birth to children. Later on, they multiplied and formed a state. This is why their people like to sing long-songs with a drawn-out voice, similar to the howling of wolves.

— Weishu, 103; translated by Inaba Minoru.

=== Rouran Domination ===
In 391 the Rouran chief, Heduohan was killed by the Tuoba Northern Wei. Heduohan's brother Shelun raided several tribal dependencies of the Tuoba in retaliation, but reportedly suffered a serious defeat in 399, and was forced to flee westward. Here Shelun defeated the Hulu tribe and subjugated them. With the aid of a Hulu named Chiluohou, Shelun conquered most of the Gaoche tribes and proclaimed himself Kaghan of the Rouran on March 11, 402. Many Gaoche, such as Chiluohou, were promoted to establish better control.

During the reign of Shelun and his successor Datan, the Rouran pushed as far as the Issyk Kul, where they defeated the Wusun and drove them south. In the east they raided the Northern Wei before they were defeated on June 16, 429. Afterwards, as many as 1.5 million Gaoche were said to have been captured and settled to areas adjacent to the capital Pingcheng in the south.

After this settlement they were called the Western Chile (西部敕勒), including a section of the Ordos Desert south of the Yellow River known as the Hexi Chile (河西敕勒), the Eastern Chile (东部敕勒), between Wuzhou and the capital suburbs, and the Northern Chile (北部敕勒), to the north and around the borders.

The greater part of the latter two possibly fled back to the steppe and were not heard of after 524 and 445 respectively. The Western Chile (mainly the Hulu and Tiele related to Fufuluo's Qifuli clan) being caused by a horse race, by which south and north were eventually assimilated.

With the loss of numerous subjects and vital resources, the Rouran went into a temporary decline. However, in 460 they launched new campaigns in the west, destroying the remnant of Northern Liang. During a campaign against Khotan in 470, the king wrote in his supplicatory letter to the Toba Emperor that all of the statelets in the west had submitted to the Rouran. In 472, Yucheng attacked Northern Wei across the western border. By the time of his death in 485, Yucheng had restored the Kaghanate to a status even more powerful than the times of Datan.

During these wars, a southwestern Gaoche tribal group known as the Fufuluo united twelve clans and rebelled, but were defeated by the Rouran. They escaped and established a state northwest of Gaochang in 487. From then on, little is known about the rest of the Gaoche until the Göktürks.

=== Fufuluo ===
The Fufuluo (副伏罗) were a Gaoche tribe of twelve clans, dwelling close to the Gaochang kingdom (likely by the Tuin River of the Govi-Altai range. Early on a Fufuluo clan known as the Yizhan (which had lived there since the mid 2nd century) allied with the Touba. In 481, the Fufuluo began to interfere with the Gaochang and deposed one of their kings. The Fufuluo were then subjugated by the Rouran Khaganate.

After the death of the Rouran ruler Yucheng in 485, his belligerent son Dulun fought more wars against the Touba Northern Wei.

After a disagreement, A-Fuzhiluo betrayed him, and in 487, together with his younger cousin Qiongqi, they managed their clans of over 100,000 yurts to escape from the pursuing armies, led by Dulun and his uncle Nagai by defeating them.

After they settled, he founded a statelet (also known as the A-Fuzhiluo kingdom) under the title of Ulu Beglik (based on an interpretation of Shiratori Kurakichi and Pulleyblank). Like the later Qibi and Xueyantuo in 605, the Fufuluo divided their rule between north and south at Dzungaria.

The Fufuluo allied with the Northern Wei in 490 and fought against the Rouran until 541 when they were dispersed by them.

Shortly after the death of Dulun in 492, several important cities on the eastern route were taken by Fufuluo, separating the Rouran from the west. With the elimination of Rouran influence, the Hephthalites, kindred steppe nomads, for the first time extended their domain as far as Karashahr, where Qiongqi was killed and his son Mietu was taken hostage.

After 507, the Hephthalites simultaneously sent eighteen embassies with gifts to the Chinese courts (twelve to Northern Wei, three to the Liang dynasty, two to Western Wei and one to Northern Zhou), as opposed to only one in 456. The Hephthalites helped Mietu. He returned to his realm and Biliyan, the successor of A-Fuzhiluo, was overthrown by his tribesmen, while shortly paying tribute to the Touba. In 508, Yujiulü Futu attacked the Fufuluo and was victorious, but was killed by Mietu on his way back. Later in 516, Yujiulü Chounu, son of Futu, defeated Mietu, and in reprisal had him towed to death by a horse. The Fufuluo went into exile several years under the refuge of the Hephthalites. In 520, Chounu was repulsed by his younger brother Yifu who restored the realm. After his defeat, Chounu returned to the east, where he was killed in a coup in which the ruling clan of Yujiulu was split into two factions. In 521, the Fufuluo penetrated into Rouran territory, but were repulsed by 524. Thereafter, the Fufuluo suffered a series of defeats from Anagui before being annihilated in 541. During the final decade, they helped the Eastern Wei fight the Western Wei in a civil war. After defeat, the nobility surrendered to them.

=== Rulers of Gaoche ===
Family names and given name	Durations of reigns
Family name and given name
阿伏至羅 Āfúzhìluó	487–503
跋利延 Bálìyán	503–505
彌俄突 Mí'étú	505–516
伊匐 Yīfú	516–524
越居 Yuèjū	524–536
比造 Bǐzào	536–540
去賓 Qùbīn	540–541

== Tiele ==
=== Emergence of the Tiele ===
The term Tiele appeared in Chinese literature from the 6th century to 8th century, and most scholars agree that Tiele is simply different Chinese characters used to describe the same Turkic word as Chile, although some scholars disagree on what the specific original Turkic word may be: Tölöš ~ Töliš, Türk, or Tegreg ~ Tägräg. The name "Tiele" was first interpreted as "Tölis" by Édouard Chavannes and Vilhelm Thomsen, but this was pointed out as inaccurate in 1937 by Cen Zhongmian, as Tölis applied to the Turkic title of official (突利失 Tulishi) in the east that also came to be attached to the Xueyantuo qaghan. Some scholars (Haneda, Onogawa, Geng, etc.) proposed that Tiele, Dili, Dingling, Chile, Tele, & Tujue all transliterated underlying Türk; however, Golden proposed that Dili, Dingling, Chile, Tele, & Tiele transliterated Tegrek while Tujue transliterated Türküt, plural of Türk. The appellation Türük (Old Turkic: 𐱅𐰇𐰼𐰰) ~ Türk (OT: 𐱅𐰇𐰼𐰚) (whence Middle Chinese 突厥 *dwət-kuɑt > *tɦut-kyat > standard Chinese: Tūjué) was initially reserved exclusively for the Göktürks by Chinese, Tibetans, and even the Turkic-speaking Uyghurs. In contrast, medieval Muslim writers, including like Ottoman historians like Mustafa Âlî and explorer Evliya Çelebi as well as Timurid scientist Ulugh Beg, often viewed Inner Asian tribes, "as forming a single entity regardless of their linguistic affiliation" commonly used Turk as a generic name for Inner Asians (whether Turkic- or Mongolic-speaking). Only in modern era do modern historians use term Turks to describe an ethno-cultural collection of various Turkic groups.

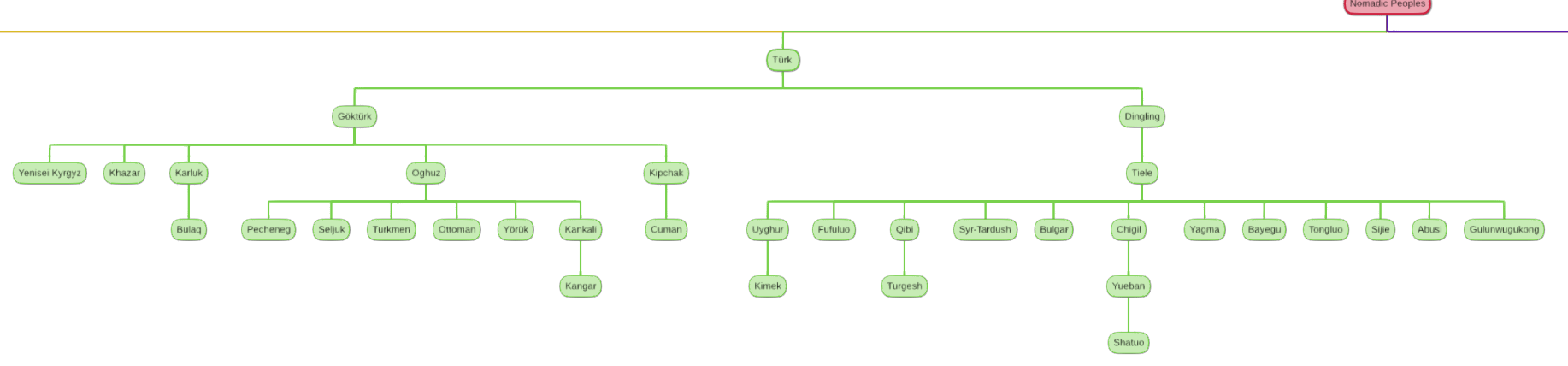
Lineage of the Tiele

In 546 the remainder of the Fufuluo, now called Tiele, rebelled and were defeated by Bumin Khan at Dzungaria. Around 250,000 of them were then incorporated into his army. In 552, Bumin Khan sent his army and defeated Anagui just north of the Chinese border. Two years before his death, he eliminated the remnants of the Rouran to the north and subjugated the Tiele.

According to the Book of Sui, the Tiele consisted of over 40 tribes divided into seven locations:

The ancestors of the Tiele were the descend[a]nts of the Xiongnu. There were many clans among the Tiele, who were compactly distributed along the valley from the east of the Western Sea.

1. In the North of the Tola [Duluo 獨洛] river, there were Boqut (Pugu, 僕骨, MC buk-kuot), Toŋra (Tongluo, 同羅, MC duŋ-lɑ), Uyγur (Weihe, 韋紇, MC ɦʷɨi- ɦet), Bayirqu (Bayegu, 拔也古, MC bʷɑt-jja-kuo) and Fuluo (覆羅, MC phək-lɑ), whose leaders were all called Irkin (Sijin, 俟斤, MC ɖʐɨ-kɨn) by themselves. And there were other clans such as Mengchen (蒙陳, MC muŋ-ɖin), Turuhe (吐如紇, MC thuo-ɲjɷ-ɦet), Siqit (Sijie, 斯結, MC sie-ket), Qun (Hun, 渾, MC ɦuon) and Huxue (斛薛, MC ɦuk-siɛt). These clans had a powerful army of almost 20,000 men.
2. In the west of Hami (Yiwu) [伊吾], North of Karashahr (Yanqi), and close to Aqtagh (Bai [White] Mountain), there were Qibi (契弊, CE khet-biɛi), Boluozhi (薄落職, CE bɑk-lɑk-tɕɨk), Yidie (乙咥, CE ʔˠit-tet), Supo (蘇婆, CE suo-bʷɑ), Nahe (那曷, CE nɑ-ɦɑt), Wuhuan (烏讙, CE ʔuo-hʷjɐn), Hegu (紇骨, CE ɦet-kuot), Yedie (也咥, CE jja-tet), Yunihuan (於尼讙, CE ʔuo-ɳi-hʷjɐn) and so on. These clans had powerful army of almost 20 thousands men.
3. In the Southwest of Altai Mountain (Jin Mountain), there were Xueyantuo (薛延陀, CE siɛt-jiɛn-dɑ), Dieleer (咥勒兒, CE tet-lək-ɲie), Shipan (十槃, CE ʥip-bʷan), Daqi (達契, CE thɑt-khet) and so on, which have army of more than 10,000 men.
4. In the north of Samarkand, close to Ade river, there were Hedie (訶咥, CE hɑ-tet), Hejie (曷嶻, CE ɦɑt-dzɑt), Bohu (撥忽, CE pʷɑt-huot), Bigan (比干, CE pi-kɑn), Juhai (具海, CE gju-həi), Hebixi (曷比悉, CE ɦɑt-pi-sit), Hecuosu (何嵯蘇, CE ɦɑ-ʣɑ-suo), Bayewei (拔也未, CE bʷɑt-jja-mʷɨi), Keda (渴達, CE khɑt-thɑt) and so on, which have an army of more than 30,000 men.
5. In the east and west of Deyihai (得嶷海), there were Sulujie (蘇路羯, CE suoluo-kjɐt), Sansuoyan (三索咽, CE sɑm-sɑk-ʔet), Miecu (蔑促, CE met-tshjuok), Longhu (隆忽, CE ljuŋ-huot) and so on, more than 8,000 men.
6. In the east of Fulin (拂菻), there were Enqu (恩屈, CE ʔən-kjut), Alan (阿蘭, CE ʔɑ-lɑn), Beirujiuli (北褥九離, CE pək-nuok-kɨu-lei), Fuwenhun (伏嗢昬, CE bɨu-ʔʷˠɛt-huon) and so on, almost 20,000 men.
7. In the South of Northern Sea, there were Dubo (都波, CE tuo-pʷɑ) and so forth.

Although there were so many different names of the clans, they were all called Tiele as a whole. There was no ruler among them, and they belonged to the Eastern and Western Türks separately. They lived in unsettled places, and moved along with the water and grass. They were good at shooting on horseback, and were fierce and cruel, especially greedy. They live on plundering. The clans close to the west do several kinds of cultivating, and breed more cattle and sheep than horses. Since the establishing of the Türk state, the Tiele help the Türks by participating in battles everywhere, and subdue all the groups in the North.

[...]

Their customs were mostly like those of the Türks. The differences were that the husband should stay in his wife’s family, and could not go home until the birth of his children. Also the dead were to be buried.

In the third year of Daye (607), Tiele sent an envoy and tribute to the court, and never stopped contact from that year.

— Book of Sui, 84

The original manuscript contains no punctuation, so different scholars read and reconstruct the ethonyms differently.

The Tiele were a large tribal group, however it is unlikely they would have been under unified leadership. References of the tribes in the remote areas west of the Pamir Mountains were sparse and mentioned only in passing, some tribes like the Alans were probably erroneously added. By the end of the 6th century nothing more was known about them. Those tribes in the eastern areas (north of China and near Lake Baikal), such as the Guligan, Duolange, Xijie and Baixi were being rewarded afterward, though a few like the Fuluo, Mengchen and Turuhe disappeared. Fuluo were possibly linked to the Fuli in the Book of Sui, the Fuli in Tanghuiyao and the Bökli-Çöligil in the Kul Tigin inscription.

According to some researchers (Onogawa, 1940; Duan, 1988; Lung, 2011; Davis, 2008; Tang, 2009; etc.), the Göktürks' leading Ashina clan were descended from the Tiele tribe by ancestral lineage. Like the Göktürks, the Tiele were probably one of many nomadic Turkic peoples on the steppe. However, Lee & Kuang (2017) state that Chinese histories did not describe the Ashina-led Göktürks as descending from the Dingling or belonging to the Tiele confederation.

The Tiele were ruled by the Göktürks during the mid 6th century and early 7th century. Many of their tribal chiefs were expelled and some were killed during this period. When the Göktürks' power peaked, at least 15 Tiele tribes were named:

Tiele are originally Xiongnu's splinter stocks. As Tujue are strong and prosperous, all Tiele districts (郡) are divided and scattered, the masses gradually dwindled and weakened. Until the beginning of Wude [era], there have been Xueyantuo, Qibi, Huihe, Dubo, Guligan, Duolange, Pugu, Bayegu, Tongluo, Hun, Sijie, Huxue, Xijie, Adie, Baixi, etc. scattered north of the [Gobi] desert.

— Old Book of Tang, 199, lower

The Tiele allied themselves in a rebellion against the Göktürks during the turmoil between 599 and 603. This might have already started as early as in 582, when rumor was spread about a revolt in the north when a raiding campaign led Ishbara Qaghan away from the capital. Among the rivals of Ishbara in the west was Tardu, son of Istämi. He allied with Apa Khan, a kaghan at the northern Dzungaria and Khovd River, and declared himself independent.

In 587 Baga Khan, heir of Ishbara, captured Apa with the help of the Chinese but died the next year on a campaign in the west. Later, Dulan took over his reign and in 599 he, together with Tardu, launched a civil war against his son Qimin, who sided with the Chinese. However, he was unsuccessful and was assassinated during his battles with the Chinese. His partner Tardu took over and launched a revolt against the Khaganate. In 603 he was revolted against by the Tiele tribes, provoked by the Chinese, and fled to the Tuyuhun. Earlier, when Apa was captured, Nili took over from him, but he died after the defeat of Tardu in the east. His son Heshana Khan succeeded him in the Western Khaganate, levying heavy taxes on the Tiele. To prevent a revolt he gathered several hundreds of chiefs and murdered them. In 605 an alliance among the Tiele under the Qibi and Xueyantuo tribes was formed to overthrow him. They captured most of the Dzungaria and defeated his occupying army, taking several important cities, including Kumul, Karashahr and Gaochang, pushing Heshana Khan further west to the lower Ili River by 607.

After victory, the Qibi chief Geleng was proclaimed as the kaghan by the tribes and the Xueyantuo chief Yiedie Khan as subordinate kaghan. At the same year Geleng allied with the Chinese to defeat the Tuyuhun to resolve a conflict at Dunhuang.

In 611, Shekui, a kaghan from Tashkent and grandson of Tardu, attacked Chuluo and forced him to flee to China. The return of Shekui marked the end of the rebellion, although exactly when the rebels were put down is uncertain. One Chinese account indicated that the Gaochang kingdom still remained as their vassal until 612. They were most likely subdued after this year as Shekui restored order in the Western Khaganate.

Failure to put down these uprisings led to a fatal division within the Ashina clan. Under the leadership of Zhenzhu Khan in 628, grandson of Yishibo, the Xueyantuo made their crossing over the Altai, and quickly founded a confederation with the rest of the Tiele in the east.

The Xueyantuo founded a short-lived khaganate over the steppe under Zhenzhu Khan, his son Duomi Khan and nephew Yitewushi Khan, the last of which eventually surrendered to the Chinese.

=== Chinese subjugation ===
Shortly after 646, the Uyghur and the rest of the twelve Tiele chiefs (and subsequently the distant Guligan and Dubo) arrived at the Chinese court. They were bestowed either with the title of commander-in-chief (dudu) or prefect (cishi) under the loose control (jimi) of the northern protectorate or "pacificed north", whose seat and name changed at certain times.

The Uyghur were prominent among the Tiele tribes next to the Xueyantuo. Their name first appeared in 390 as Yuanhe. Under the leadership of Pusa, son of chief Tejian, the Uyghur co-operated with the Xueyantuo to make a stand against the Eastern Khaganate. Soon after his death, his successor Tumidu formed a new alliance with the Chinese and turned against his former ally. Thereafter, Tumidu was granted a Chinese title like the rest of the Tiele chiefs, and carried the title of kaghan among the other tribes, who now annually donated furs to the Chinese to fulfill their tax obligations.

In 648, Tumidu was murdered by his nephew Wuhe and another tribesman named Juluobo. Both were sons-in-law of the Chebi Khan, the ruler of the Eastern Khaganate at the northern Altai, who now held hegemony over the surrounding tribes, including the Qarluq. This alerted the Chinese, and Wuhe was assassinated by a ruse upon receiving his uncle's position from the Chinese deputy in the north. Later Juluobo was detained by the Chinese. On November 17, Porun was granted his fathers title.

Since their submission, the Tiele (mainly the Uyghur) had participated in several campaigns under Chinese leadership. Under the command of Ashina Sheer, Yuan Lichen, Gao Kan, Liang Jianfang, Cheng Zhijie, Su Ding Fang and Xiao Siya this resulted in the capture of Chebi Khan in 650 and the end of the Western Khaganate in 657, except for a last campaign at Goguryeo which probably killed Porun.

During those campaigns, visits would be paid to restrain the tribes. In 658 such a visit was repelled, a revolt broke out in 660 starting with the Sijie, Bayegu, Pugu and Tongluo, and it was joined by the other 5 tribes later. The reason for this revolt is unclear, perhaps due to the Chinese repression of the surrounding tribes during the campaigns. Two years later the revolts were suppressed by the Chinese at the upper Selenge River around Khangai. The battle was short, and a massacre was said to be committed by the two leading commanders. According to one exaggerated account from Tang Huiyao around 900,000 surrendered tribesmen were slaughtered, though it is certain that a large number of them were captured. After the event, a message was sent to the north to appease the restlest Tiele.

In 669 similar unsuccessful revolts had been made by the Xueyantuo, but the details of these are vague. The last revolt was mentioned in 686, led by the Pugu and Tongluo to join with the Ashina clan, who had formed the Second Turkic Khaganate under Ilterish Qaghan in 682. They were immediately suppressed by an army dispatched from Juyan. A number of them were moved to that region along with the seat of the protectorate under the jurisdiction of Ganzhou. Earlier during the rebellion contact between the northern protectorate and the Chinese capital was cut off, and the only way to pass was through Suzhou.

=== Rise of the Uyghur Khaganate ===
After the disintegration of the Eastern Khaganate in 630, many Göktürk nobles were resettled either at the Chinese border or in the capital. Some went on to participate in frontier campaigns for the Chinese.

In 679 a major rebellion was led by three Göktürk nobles. Among them, Ashina Nishufu, a direct descendant of Illig, was chosen as their kaghan. They were quickly subdued by the Chinese and their leader was betrayed and killed by his own troops. The rest of the Göktürks managed to escape and allied themselves with Ashina Funian for a new rebellion. Funian declared himself kaghan in 681, but his revolt did not succeed and more than fifty participants were executed on November 16 at the Chinese capital. The remaining rebellious Göktürks formed the Second Turkic Eastern Khaganate under Ilteris Sad and his 5,000 supporters. They were mostly active in the southern region bordering China at Mount Čoγay. Over the decade they held countless raids across the Chinese border.

Exactly when or how the Tiele were subjected by China. However, during this period, a number of pro-Chinese Tiele groups who had earlier cooperated with the Chinese against them, such as Uyghur, Qibi, Sijie and Hun, escaped into the Hexi Corridor and eventually resettled to Liangzhou.

According to the Tonyukuk and Kültigin Orkhon script, the Göktürks made five out of forty-seven attacks on the Tiele who were led by Ilteris. Among them, four seem to have been mere raids while the last attack could be seen as their re-subjection on the northern steppe. The estimated date for the Tiele submission to the Göktürks would be around 687, probably without much resistance.

The establishment of a second Göktürk capital at the foot of the sacred mountain Ötüken brought unrest to the Tiele tribes. After the Uyghur chief was killed, they were recruited for their annual raiding campaigns over the Chinese border after 694. These raids stopped in 708, as the Chinese constructed fortifications along the Ordos. Raids continued elsewhere as Qapagan turned his attention to the west and the Turgesh and Qarluq tribes between 708 and 715. By this time, some of the Tiele had escaped into China and were settled in Lingzhou and elsewhere, while others like the Bayegu had revolted in 707. These revolts continued until 716 and Qapagan, on his way back from suppressing revolts by the Uyghur, Tongluo, Baixi, Bayegu and Pugu, was ambushed and killed by a Bayegu tribesman named Xiezhilue on July 22. Two of the northernmost tribal allies, the Guligan and Dubo, did not participate in any of the revolts.

Soon, Bilge Khan took over and together with Tonyukuk, began to appease the subjected Tiele. Tonyukuk was born in China and was described as a wise statesman in both Turkic and Chinese accounts. Meanwhile, a friendly relationship was built with the Chinese. Until the end of the Second Eastern Khaganate only one raid in 720 was made on the Chinese border. Bilge Khan started to call for a return of the former members of the Tiele tribes who had settled in China. He had risen in status among the tribal chiefs, especially the Uyghur within the Khaganate.

During this period, many Tiele had betrayed the local Chinese authorities and fled to the north, in particular the five communities around Liang, Ling, Xia, Feng, and Bingzhou, while minor insurgencies had occurred throughout the process. Among the returning Tiele tribes was the Uyghur, specifically the Yaoluoge, who had escaped into China and lived there until 727. The Yaoluoge were one of nine clans of the Uyghur, and had probably dominated for six generations since the fall of Xueyantuo.

After Bilge Khan was poisoned, there were factional struggles within the ruling clan. Within a few years, an alliance was established between the Basmyl, Uyghur and Qarluq. They overthrew the Göktürks and killed the kaghan. Most of the heirs were subsequently killed. At the same time the Basmyl chief, who was approved as kaghan, was overthrown by the allies.

In 745 the exiled kaghan of the Göktürks was killed by a Uyghur chief named Qutlugh Boyla, son of Hushu. He founded the new Uyghur Khaganate with the title of Qutlugh Bilge Köl Qaghan. The name "Tiele", and the "nine allies (of Tiele)" (九姓) or Toquz Oguz (based on the interpretation of scholar Cen Zhongmian in the late 1950s) is not mentioned afterwards, and was probably replaced by the name Huihu (Uyghur) in historic records. From then on the Uyghur consisted of seven former Tiele tribes and two new tribes, while eight former Tiele tribal names had now disappeared.

== See also ==
- Qibi tribe
- Qibi Heli
