= Yiwuzhenmohe Qaghan =

- Qaghan of the Tiele
- Reign: 606 – before 620
- Born: Qibi Geleng 契苾歌楞
Regnal name
- Yìwùzhēn Mòhè Kèhán 易勿真莫賀可汗
- House: Qibi

Yiwuzhenmohe Qaghan (Chinese: 易勿真莫賀可汗) or Yaghmurchin Bagha Qaghan (Personal name: Qibi Geleng, Chinese: 契苾歌楞) was a tribal chief of Qibi tribe who ruled briefly over Turkic tribes of Xueyantuo, Tiele and Huihe.

== Reign ==
At the time of Geleng's rule over the Tiele as Erkin or Elteber which was made of 15 tribes, the Tiele were subserviant to the Western Turkic Khaganate's Heshana Qaghan (r. 602/303–611). Heshana was said to be collecting excessive taxes from the Tiele, leading to resentment among the Tiele. Heshana thus suspected the Tiele chieftains and, on one occasion, gathered some 100 chieftains and killing them. The Tiele rebelled and supported Geleng, the chieftain of the Qibi as khagan. They also supported Yishibo of the Xueyantuo as Yiedie Khan, as a subordinate khan under Geleng. He subjected cities of Gaochang, Yiwu and Yanqi.

== End of reign ==
Later, after Western Turkic Khaganate's Shikui Khagan (r. 610–617) came to power, it was said that the Tiele again submitted to Western Turkic rule. The Xueyantuo would not have another khan until Yishibo's grandson Yi'nan, then a vassal of the Eastern Turkic Khaganate, rebelled against the Eastern Turks and was made Zhenzhu Khan by Emperor Taizong of Tang. Yiwuzhen's nephew Qibi Heli would go on to be a Tang general.
