= Yiedie Khan =

- Irkin; Khan

Khan of Xueyantuo
- Reign: c. 605 – c. 611
- Successor: Zhenzhu Khan

Yiedie or Yedie Khan (Chinese: 也咥可汗; pinyin: Yědié Kèhán), personal name Yishibo (乙失缽, probably Chinese form of Turkic Ishbara), was a 7th-century Turkic political leader of the Xueyantuo, the first to have taken the title of khan.

== Life ==
Yiedie Khan title prior being khan was Irkin (Chinese: 俟斤; pinyin: Yijīn), meaning he was a tribal leader. At the time of his rule over the Xueyantuo, the Xueyantuo were a part of the Tiele people, made of 15 tribes, which at the time submitted to the Western Turkic Khaganate's Heshana Qaghan (r. 603–611). According to the Book of Sui, Heshana Qaghan was collecting excessive taxes from the Tiele, leading to resentment among the tribes. Heshana thus suspected the Tiele chieftains and, on one occasion, gathered several hundred chieftains and killed them.

The Tiele thereafter rebelled and enthroned Irkin Geleng (Chinese: 俟斤歌楞; pinyin: Yijīn Gēléng), the chieftain of the Qibi (契苾) as Yiwuzhenmohe Khan (易勿真莫賀可汗), who formed his power base around Bogda Shan. They also supported Yishibo as Yiedie Khan, as a subordinate khan under Geleng. His power was centered around north of the Yanmo Mountain (Chinese: 燕末山; pinyin: Yànmò Shān, near modern Emin County, China).

Later, after the Western Turkic Khaganate's Shikui Khagan (r. 611–618) came to power, the Tiele was again reconquered by the Turkic army. According to the Book of Sui, both Yiwuzhenmohe Khan and Yiedie Khan renounced their khan titles as part of their submission. The Xueyantuo would not have another khan until Yiedie Khan's grandson Yi'nan, then a vassal of the Eastern Turkic Khaganate, rebelled against Turks and was made khan by Emperor Taizong of Tang.

== Sources ==
- Zizhi Tongjian, vol. 192.

Preceded by None	Khan of Xueyantuo c. 605 – c. 611	Succeeded by Zhenzhu Khan (Yi'nan)
