= Yinan =

Yinan may refer to:

- Yinan County, in Shandong, China
- Zhenzhu Khan (died 645), personal name Yi'nan (夷男), khan of Xueyantuo
- Diao Yinan (born 1969), Chinese director, screenwriter, and actor
- Wang Yinan (born 1989), Chinese swimmer
