= Duomi Khan =

Khan of the Xueyantuo

Duomi Khan (多彌可汗) (died 646), personal name Bazhuo (拔灼), full regal name Jialijulixueshaduomi Khan (頡利俱利薛沙多彌可汗), was a khan of the Xueyantuo. After the death of his father, Zhenzhu Khan, he disputed with and killed his older brother, Yemang (曵莽), and became khan in 645. Then, reversing his father's peaceful policy with the Tang dynasty, Duomi Khan immediately started incursions into their territory. This drew a heavy response from Emperor Taizong of Tang, who sent the generals Qiao Shiwang (喬師望), Zhishi Sili, and Li Daozong to defend. They proved too strong for Duomi Khan's attacks, so he fled. He did not live long as he was betrayed by his own vassal, the Uyghers, who rebelled and killed him.

== Under Zhenzhu Khan ==
It is not known when Bazhuo was born, but it is known that he was not his father Zhenzhu Khan's oldest son (Zhenzhu's oldest son was various referred to as Jialibi (頡利苾), Dadu (大度), and Yemang (曳莽), who may have been the same person) but as he was born to Zhenzhu's wife, he was in an honored position in Zhenzhu's court starting from early times in Zhenzhu's reign. As of 638, with Zhenzhu having more than 200,000 soldiers under him, he was said to have divided his army between Bazhuo and Jialibi, having Bazhuo command the army to the south and Jialibi to the north; it was further said that Emperor Taizong of Tang, in order to foster dissent between the brothers, made them both subordinate khans under Zhenzhu and awarded them drums and banners, ostensibly to honor them. In a reference that may have been referring to the same event, Bazhuo and Yemang were described to have been both made subordinate khans, at Zhenzhu's request, with Yemang given the eastern part of the khanate to govern over various tribes, with the title of Tulishi Khan, and with Bazhuo given the western part of the khanate to govern over the Xueyantuo people, with the title of Siyehu Khan.

== As khan of Xueyantuo ==
Zhenzhu died in the fall of 645. Both Yemang and Bazhuo attended the funeral. It was said that Yemang was violent and disturbed, and also had a bad relationship with Bazhuo. After the funeral, Yemang, fearing that Bazhuo would harm him, left suddenly to return to the eastern part of the khanate. Bazhuo chased him down and killed him, and then took the throne with the title of Jialijulixueshaduomi Khan (or Duomi Khan for short).

Duomi Khan, after he took the throne, decided to attack China's Tang dynasty, believing that with Emperor Taizong on a campaign against Goguryeo, that the Tang borders would be undefended. However, Taizong, anticipating the possibility of a Xueyantuo attack, had had the general Zhishi Sili (執失思力) command Göktürk soldiers to defend Xia Prefecture (夏州, roughly modern Yulin, Shaanxi). Once Duomi attacked, Zhishi Sili and another general, Tian Renhui (田仁會), set a trap to induce Duomi to attack Xia Prefecture, and defeated him once he was at Xia Prefecture. Duomi withdrew, but soon attacked Xia Prefecture again. Briefly after new year 646, Taizong ordered, in addition to Zhishi and Tian's troops, for troops to be mobilized under the generals Li Daozong, Xue Wanche (薛萬徹), Ashina She'er (阿史那社爾), Song Junming (宋君明), and Xue Guwu (薛孤吳), to defend against Duomi's attack, which Duomi called off after reaching the Great Wall and realizing that Tang forces had been mobilized. In turn, in the spring of 646, Zhishi and Qiao Shiwang (喬師望) counterattacked, defeating Duomi and forcing him to flee, throwing the Xueyantuo into a state of confusion.

Meanwhile, it was said that Duomi was intolerant and ill-tempered, as well as suspicious. He removed Zhenzhu's chief advisors and replaced them with people close to him, which led to the nobles despising him—and he responded by killing a large number of them, throwing the Xueyantuo court into terror. Yaoluoge Tumidu (藥羅葛吐迷度), the chieftain of the Uyghurs, a Xueyantuo's vassal tribe, rebelled along with the Pugu (僕骨) and Tongluo (同羅) tribes and dealt Duomi a great defeat. Taizong took the chance to order a major assault against Xueyantuo proper by Li, Ashina, Zhishi, Qibi Heli (契苾何力), Xue Wanche, and Zhang Jian (張儉). As the assault was beginning, by chance a Tang officer, Yuwen Fa (宇文法), was serving as an emissary to the Wuluohu (烏羅護) and the Mohe and returning toward Tang, when he encountered the Xueyantuo general Abo (阿波). Yuwen attacked Abo with the Mohe troops with him at the time and defeated Abo—which led to even greater confusion for the Xueyantuo, whose people believed that the main Tang army had already arrived. In panic, Duomi fled to the vassal Ashide (阿史德) tribe, and when Uygher forces heard this, they attacked and killed Duomi, killing any Xueyantuo imperial clan members they could find. The Uyghers took over most of the Xueyantuo's territory, while many Xueyantuo generals surrendered to the Tang. Duomi's cousin Duomozhi tried to revive the Xueyantuo fortunes, but soon surrendered to the Tang, ending the Xueyantuo as a khanate.

== See also ==
- Emperor Taizong's campaign against Xueyantuo

== Notes and references ==
- Tang Huiyao, vol. 96.

Regnal titles
Preceded by Zhenzhu Khan (Yi'nan)	Khan of Xueyantuo; 645–646	Succeeded by Yitewushi Khan (Duomozhi)
