= Qibi tribe =

Tiele tribe

Qibi tribe (Chinese: 契苾 ~ 契弊; Middle Chinese: *kʲiei-pɪ̯et; Saka: Kāribari) was a Turkic tribe and a part of Tiele confederation, then Toquz Oghuz and later Uyghur Khaganate. Most famous member of the tribe was Qibi Heli.

== Area ==
According to the epigraphy of Qibi Song (契苾嵩), a Tiele general in the service of the Tang dynasty (730), the origins of the Qibi can be traced to the Khangai Mountains prior to their presence in the Bogda Mountains during the 6th century. They were related to the Jiepi (解批) of Gaoche, who were situated east of the Fufuluo. In early Tang period, they lived in Yingsuo Prefecture (modern Yanqi 焉耆, Xinjiang). The Qibi were dispersed shortly after the defeat of chief Geleng (哥楞). In the east they were put under the rule of a tudun (吐屯) named Ashina Hubo (阿史那斛勃), who became known as the Chebi Khagan. After 632, they were located to Yuxi Prefecture (榆溪).

== Known members ==
1. Qibi Geleng (契苾歌楞) — Khagan of Tiele confederation as Yiwuzhenmohe Qaghan
2. Qibi Ge (契苾葛) — Prince of Tiele confederation as Baghatur Tegin (莫賀咄特勤)
  1. Qibi Heli (契苾何力) — 1st Duke of Liang (涼國公), general in early Tang dynasty and a companion of Taizong of Tang
    - Qibi Ming (契苾明) (649-695) — 2nd Duke of Liang, general of Tang dynasty
      - Qibi Song (契苾嵩, d. 730) — General of Tang army, 3rd Duke of Liangguo
      - Qibi Zong (契苾嵸, d. 746) — General of the Left Leopard Tao Guard of Tang army (左豹韜衛大將軍)
      - Qibi Fan (契苾番, d. 746) — General of Tang army
      - Qibi Chong (契苾崇, d. 746)
    - Qibi Guang (契苾光, d. ~709) — General of the Guards during reign of Wu Zetian
      - Qibi Qin (契苾嶔, d. 728)
        - Qibi Shangbin (契苾尚賓, 705-733, died at Jingzhao)
      - Qibi Yin (契苾崟)
        - Qibi Liangbin (契苾梁濱)
    - Qibi Zhen (契苾貞) — Secretary of the Palace
    - Qibi Mou (契苾某, d. ~709)
      - Qibi Feng (契苾峰)
        - Qibi Jiabin (契苾嘉賓) — Great General of the Guard in Tang army (衛大將軍)
          - Qibi Yi (契苾漪, d. 814) — Governor of Shengzhou (勝州, near modern Yulin, Shanxi) during Yuanhe era
            - Qibi Tong (契苾通, 774-855) — Governor of Danzhou (846-847), Xianning (847), Weizhou (842), Leping (845), Shengzhou (839), Protector General to Pacify the North (852-854) and Jiedushi of Zhenwu Circuit. Fought against Wujie Qaghan
              - Qibi Gongwen (契苾公文)
              - Qibi Gongying (契苾公應)
              - Qibi Gongyu (契苾公瑜)
              - Qibi Gongwu (契苾公武)
              - Qibi Gongyue (契苾公約)
              - Qibi Gongshou (契苾公綬)
              - Qibi Gongmou (契苾公某)
              - Qibi Gongyi (契苾公廙, d. 881)
              - Qibi Gongdu (契苾公度, d. 881)
  2. Qibi Shamen (契苾沙門) — Chieftain of Qibi tribe under Zhenzhu Khagan

A member of the tribe, Qibi Zhang (契苾璋) was the military governor of Zhenwu Circuit (振武, headquartered in modern Hohhot, Inner Mongolia) from 881 to 882.
