= Kul-chur inscription =

Turkic inscription

Kul-chur inscription or Küli Čor inscription was an inscription erected in honor of a military leader called Kul Chur of the Xueyantuo. It was erected between 723 and 725.

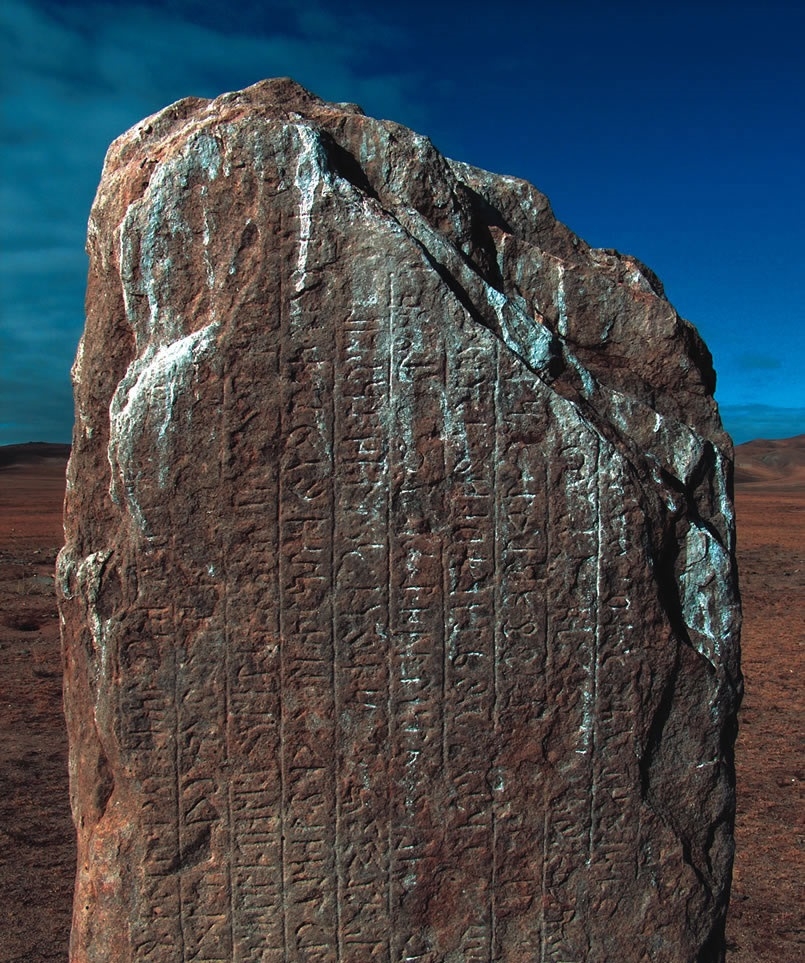
Kul-chur inscription, front side.

== Discovery and translation ==
=== Region ===
It is located in Ih-hoshoot district of Delgerkhaan, Töv Province, 200 km (120 mi) southwest from Ulaanbaatar, Mongolia. Location: N46º54´ - E104º33´

=== Complete text ===
Old Turkic original:

...üčün (apa) tarqan Čїqan Toňuquq atïγ bermiš
...quda jegtürmiš Išbara Čїqan Küli Čur bolmïš...
.../qaγan/ elinte aqarïp edgü beŋi körti Uluγ Küli Čur sekiz on yašap yoq bol/tï/
özlüki boz at erti kedim b... alïpï erdemi anta ükü еgіdi Türük budunqa u...
saγïrač uluγïn yaγïtuqda /Küli / Čur/.. sančïp ölürüp oγulïn kisisin bulun...
... elig tutdï /ker.?./ ...erti Küli Čur Türük budun ...
...γanïŋa el/iŋe/ ......bilgesin üčün alpïn erdemin /üčün qazγantï qa/... el...č..
...Ïšbara Bilge Küli Čur kiši ....in
...erti süŋüš bolsar čerïγ iter erti ab ablasar erimeli teg erti
...sančdï Кečinde tümen süke süŋüšdi Küli Čur oplayu tegip süsin
...ïtï ..... /Beš/balïqda törüt sü/ŋüš/ süŋüšdükde Küli Čur oplayu tegip süsin bulγayu
...Tab/γačqa bunča süŋüšüp alpïn erdemin üčün üküs bunča tutdï

Küli Čur Teŋiri tutdï

...oγulïn ...dunïn udïz...
... Küli Čur tarduš budunïγ ïtï ayu olurtï
.../qadam/ er yarïγ üzlekin binip /oplayu tegip/ üč erig sančdï ...süŋüšdükde Küli Čur üzleki jegren at binip
...anta kerü barïp Yenčü ügüzüg keče Temir Qapïγqa Tezikke tegi sü/ŋüšdükde/ qazγantï Toquz Oγuzqa jeti süŋüš süŋüšdükde
...a tükedi Qïtaň Tatabï .../tegi/ süŋüšdükde bes süŋüš süŋüšdükde Küli Čur anča bilgesi čabïsï erti alïpï bökesi erti
.../Kü/li Čur jeti yašïŋa jegir ölürti /toquz yašïŋa / azïqlγï toŋuz ölürti Qarluq yaγïtuqda Tezde süŋüšdükde
... anta kisre Qarluqqa yem (d?) süŋü/šdükd/e Edil aqïn binip oplayu tegip sanča ïdïp toplayu inti yana aγïtïp
...sü sürti Qarluqïγ kečіgintükin sančdï Qarluq tapa ... γalï barïp Azïn erig yana binip süsi kegürti Qarluq atlantï anča sün
.../Qa/rluq jegiren ermeli arqašïn sïyu urtï Qarluq anïn turup ... Elteber özi kelti Еsir Erkin oγulï Jegen Čur kelti
.../erin/ sančγalï süledi süŋüšip süsin sančdï elin altï oγulïn kisisin bulandï ..γ...a Išbara Bilge Küli Čur
...üke tusu bol..q öde ülügi anča ermiš erinč yaγïqa yalŋus oplayu tegip oplayu kirip üze qïšqa kergeg boltï
...qaγan inisi El Čur tegin kelip ulayu törüt tegin kelip Išbara Bilge Küli Čurïγ yoγlatï bedizin bedizti olurtï
...sin bu...m qazγantï artuq yïlqïγ igiti

...k tegin kelti /Tarduš/ .. Čurïŋ oγulï Jegen Čur kelti
...in üčün bunča qoburïp yoγladï Ebiztir bitidim
...qa bilmez biligin biltükmen ödkümen bunča bitig bitidim
...tutdï...

English translation:

and then he was given the name – (Apa) tarkhan Chykan Tonyukuk.
then they won (led by) Yshbar Chykan Kuli-Chur.
in Elteris kagan's state getting old and finding an eternal glory, The Great Kuli Chur at the age of eighty passed away.
… there was rapid Whitehorse…was great and powerful, became famous for Turkic people…
when were fighting… Kuli-Chur … he stabbed with spear to death. Sons, people…
… he ruled the country… Kuli-Chur. Turkic people….
…to kagan, to the country… due to his intelligence and great power, he ruled the country…
…Ysbara Bilge Kuli – Chur:…
… He headed the battle in the war. When it was the hunting he led the hunting.
…At Kechin he met multitumen (decimal) army in the battle.
…At Beshbalyk in four battles he attacked four times…
…In battles with Tabgaches he many times got fame as a great warrior. So much he had conquered!

Kuli Chur bent Tengri.

…sons, people…
… Kuli Chur ruled Tardush people.
… with the armour of a warrior on a quick horse he bit with the spear three soldiers (enemy)… at the battle he rode a quick bay horse…
…then swimming across the Pearl river, reaching Iron Gates he fought with Tezhik and subdued them. He had seven battles with Nine Oguzes.
… in five battles with Kitans and Tatabıs Kuli-Chur was the wisest speaker, the greatest commander.
… when Kuli-Chur was seven years old he killed a fox, at nine he killed a wild boar. When Karluks were conquered, in battles at the Tez
…when they fought with Karluks he rode a white horse Edul again, rushed to attack and won the enemy…
… he fought with a spear. Bit the Karluks. A new army advanced in the direction of Karluks. Karluks put forwards their strongest army…
…with a beat Karluk broke the back of a bay horse. Karluks…Elteris came. The son Esir Erkin Yegen Chor came.
…fought and bit their army. Conquered their country. Took children and wives to prison. Esbar Bilge Kuli-Chur
…felt obliged for aid and rushed to attack alone and found his death.
…kagan, younger brother El Chur came. Four noble people held Esbara Bilge Kuli-Chur's funeral ceremony. Funeral complex was built.
…ruled…

…tegin came. (Tardush) son… Chora Yegen Chur came…
…so many people came to the ceremony. I, Ebizter, wrote.
… to know unknown things in this mortal world, I wrote all this.
… bent…

== Identity ==
Since the first line of the Küli Çor inscription is incomplete, the "apa tarqan čıqan tonyukuk atıγ bermiš" section follows the part that starts with the "üčün" preposition. It is translated as "apa tarqan gave the name čıqan tonyukuk". Thus, it is possible that the name of Küli Çor before he received his hero name (er at) was Tonyukuk. On the second line of the western face of the inscription, the missing beginning of the line could be read as "quda jegtürmiš Išbara Čїqan Küli Čur bolmïš" which translated into "(when … happened) (since) he was created (better), he took that title of Išvara Čıqan Küli Čor".

Gerard Clauson states that the first three lines of the inscription provides information on the identity of Küli Çor. He argued that the personal name of Küli Çor was Tonyukuk, (unrelated to the 646–726 Tonyukuk), since his known title was Boyla Baγa Tarqan and especially based on the name Qapaghan Qaghan to be mentioned in the third line, it was not possible for Küli Çor to have died after 716. It was not possible to obtain the title of "Köl", witnessed as Kül Tigin in Turks, and "otčigin" by Mongolians, which was given to the smallest male child of the house. It is not written with ñ but using the signs that correspond to n and y.
