= Cui Dunli =

Tang Chinese government official and diplomat

Cui Dunli (崔敦禮) (596 – August 29, 656), né Cui Yuanli (崔元禮), courtesy name Anshang (安上), formally Duke Zhao of Gu'an (固安昭公), was an official, general, and diplomat of the Chinese Tang dynasty, serving as chancellor during the reign of Emperor Gaozong.

== Background ==
Cui Dunli was born in 596, originally named Cui Yuanli, His family was from "the second house of Boling" of the prominent Cui clan of Boling, although by the end of Northern Wei it had already relocated to Yong Prefecture (雍州, roughly modern Xi'an, Shaanxi). Cui Dunli's grandfather Cui Zhongfang (崔仲方) served as the minister of ceremonies during the Sui dynasty.

== During Emperor Gaozu's reign ==
During the reign of Tang's founder Emperor Gaozu, Cui Dunli served as a mid-low-level official at the legislative bureau of government (中書省, Zhongshu Sheng). It was said that he was skillful with his words and always acted appropriately, so much so that people were intimidated when they saw him. It was during Emperor Gaozu's reign that Emperor Gaozu changed his name from the original Yuanli to Dunli, although the reason was not stated in historical records.

In 626, Emperor Gaozu's son Li Shimin the Prince of Qin, locked in an intense sibling rivalry with his older brother and Emperor Gaozu's oldest son, Li Jiancheng the Crown Prince, killed Li Jiancheng and another brother who supported Li Jiancheng, Li Yuanji the Prince of Qi at the Incident at Xuanwu Gate and effectively seized power. Emperor Gaozu's distant nephew Li Yuan (李瑗, different character than Emperor Gaozu's name) the Prince of Lujiang, who was then commandant at You Prefecture (幽州, roughly modern Beijing), was an ally of Li Jiancheng's, and when Li Shimin sent Cui to You Prefecture to summon Li Yuan to the capital Chang'an. Li Yuan became fearful, and at the instigation of his deputy Wang Junkuo (王君廓) started a rebellion. He seized Cui and tried to force Cui to reveal military secrets of the imperial army, but Cui refused. Soon, Wang himself rebelled against Li Yuan and seized him, surrendering to the imperial forces. Upon Cui's return to Chang'an, Li Shimin made him a commander of the imperial guards and awarded him with gold and good horse(s).

== During Emperor Taizong's reign ==
Later in 626, Emperor Gaozu passed the throne to Li Shimin, who took the throne as Emperor Taizong. In 627, Emperor Taizong promoted Cui Dunli to a higher post within the legislative bureau. It was said that particularly because Cui admired the great Han dynasty diplomat Su Wu, he was frequently sent as a diplomat to Eastern Tujue. At a later point, Cui became the deputy minister of defense, a post that he still held as of 642, when he was sent to Eastern Tujue's successor state Xueyantuo to negotiate a marriage of Emperor Taizong's daughter Princess Xinxing with Xueyantuo's Zhenzhu Khan Yi'nan, in order to gain the release of the general Qibi Heli (契苾何力), who had been held captive by Xueyantuo. He later served as the commandant at Ling Prefecture (靈州, roughly modern Yinchuan, Ningxia), and then was summoned back to Chang'an to serve as minister of defense. He was serving in that post as of 646, when he was sent to negotiate the surrender of Yi'nan's nephew the Yitewushi Khan Duomozhi (with Xueyantuo then in a state of collapse), although apparently before he could arrive, Duomozhi surrendered to the general Li Shiji. After Xueyantuo's collapse, its vassal Huige briefly took over its territory, but Huige itself was severely weakened in 648 when its ruler Yaoluoge Tumidu (藥羅葛吐迷度) was assassinated by his nephew Yaoluoge Wuge (藥羅葛烏紇). Emperor Taizong, apprehensive that Huige would collapse and lead to a new round of disturbances, sent Cui to pacify the Huige people and to create Yaoluoge Tumidu's son Yaoluoge Porun (藥羅葛婆閏) as the new ruler of Huige.

== During Emperor Gaozong's reign ==
In 649, Emperor Taizong died and was succeeded by his son Li Zhi (as Emperor Gaozong). Cui Dunli continued to serve as minister of defense, and in 652, he commissioned Cui with an army to gather the remaining tribesmen of Xueyantuo to force them relocate to Qilian Prefecture (祁連州, a prefecture established for them in modern Datong, Shanxi).

Later that year, Emperor Gaozong's sister Princess Gaoyang, her husband Fang Yi'ai (房遺愛), Emperor Gaozong's uncle Li Yuanjing (李元景) the Prince of Jing, Emperor Gaozong's brother Li Ke the Prince of Wu, another brother-in-law Chai Lingwu (柴令武), and the general Xue Wanche (薛萬徹), were implicated in a plot to overthrow Emperor Gaozong and replace him with Li Yuanjing. (According to traditional historians, Li Ke was not involved in the plot, but was falsely implicated by Emperor Gaozong's powerful uncle Zhangsun Wuji, who was apprehensive that Li Ke was older and considered more capable than Emperor Gaozong.) Some of them were executed, and some were ordered to commit suicide. Emperor Gaozong initially wanted to spare Li Yuanjing and Li Ke, but at Cui's opposition did not do so.

In 653, Cui was made Shizhong (侍中)—the head of the examination bureau of government (門下省, Menxia Sheng) and a post considered one for a chancellor. He became in charge of editing imperial histories, and he was created the Duke of Gu'an. In 655, he was made Zhongshu Ling (中書令), the head of the legislative bureau and still a chancellor post.

In 656, Cui, who had been given an additional post as a staff member of Emperor Gaozong's son and crown prince Li Hong as well, offered to resign on account of illness. Emperor Gaozong gave him the post as an advisor to Li Hong and no longer let him serve as Zhongshu Ling, but gave him the designation of Tong Zhongshu Menxia Sanpin (同中書門下三品), making him a chancellor de facto. Emperor Gaozong also recalled Cui's younger brother Cui Yuqing (崔餘慶), who was then serving as the military advisor to the commandant at Dingxiang (定襄, in modern Hohhot, Inner Mongolia), from Dingxiang, to attend to Cui Dunli. Cui Dunli died less a month later. Emperor Gaozong personally led a public mourning and buried him with honors, near Emperor Taizong's tomb.

== Notes and references ==
- Old Book of Tang, vol. 81.
- New Book of Tang, vol. 106
- Zizhi Tongjian, vols. 191, 196, 198, 199, 200.
