= Qibi Heli =

- 契苾何力
- Died: 677; Chang'an, Tang dynasty
- Burial place: Zhao Mausoleum
- Children: 6 daughters and 3 sons
- Military career
- Allegiance: Tang

Qibi Heli (Chinese: 契苾何力; fl. 632 – died 677), posthumous name Duke Lie of Liang (涼烈公), was an ethnic Tiele general of China's Tang dynasty and a companion of the Emperor Taizong of Tang.

== Early life ==
Qibi Heli was born to a Tiele tribe called the Qibi. He was son of Qibi Ge (契苾葛), who was a younger brother of Yiwuzhenmohe Qaghan (易勿真莫賀可汗). Orphaned at 9 years old he became the eltäbär of his tribe and lived a nomadic life around Lake Zài (nowadays Issyk-Kul lake). His father's title was Baghatur Tegin (莫賀咄特勤).

In 632, he led his tribe to submit to the Tang dynasty in Hexi, himself going to Chang'an while his mother Lady Feng and brother Qibi Shamen (契苾沙門) left behind to handle tribal affairs. He was created a general and was stationed in Liangzhou.

== During reign of Taizong ==
He participated in Emperor Taizong's campaign against Tuyuhun in 634-635, in one occasion saving lives of generals Xue Wanjun (薛萬均) and his brother Xue Wanche (薛萬徹) besides capturing Murong Fuyun's wife and children. He later participated in Tang campaign against Karakhoja in 640.

After rise of Zhenzhu Khagan of Xueyantuo in 642, Qibi tribe submitted to him. Heli tried to convince them to stay loyal to Tang. However, he was captured and brought to Khagan's camp. Where he spoke against him and proclaimed allegiance to Taizong, even cut off his ear. Taizong in turn offered a Tang princess to bribe Zhenzhu to ransom Heli. Although once freed, he persuaded Taizong not to proceed with marriage.

He was appointed deputy of Ashina She'er during Tang campaign against Kucha in 648 and later in Goguryeo–Tang War. Taizong himself tended to the injuries of the Tujue Generals Qibi Heli and Ashina Simo, who were both wounded during the war against Goguryeo. Qibi Heli was especially praised for his valor that despite being severely injured by a spear from enemies, he continued fighting furiously along with his subordinate soldiers. Despite requesting to commit suicide on Taizong's death in 649, he was forbidden by Gaozong.

== During reign of Gaozong ==
In 657, he joined the Tang conquest of the Western Turks, at some point killing Shatuo leader Zhuye Guzhu (朱邪孤注). He participated in second Goguryeo-Tang War, defeated a Goguryeo army at the Yalu River and was instrumental on the siege of Pyongyang in 668. After which he was created Great General of Left Guard and Duke of Liang (涼國公) by Gaozong. In 676, when the Tibetan Empire attacked Tang's western prefectures, Tang prince Li Xiǎn and his younger brother Li Lun, the Prince of Xiang, were nominally put in charge of the two armies that were actually commanded by the generals Liu Shenli (劉審禮) and Qibi Heli (契苾何力), but neither Li Xiǎn nor Li Lun actually set out with the troops.

He died in 677 and was buried in Zhao Mausoleum. He was honoured with the posthumous name Lie (烈) and awarded with titles. His descendants continued to serve Tang dynasty.

== Family ==
He was married to Tang dynasty relative, a daughter of governor of Lintong in 635. He fathered at least 6 daughters and 3 sons. Known sons:

1. Qibi Ming (契苾明) (649-695) - General of Tang dynasty, Duke of Liangguo (Posthumously Jing - 靖)
2. Qibi Guang (契苾光, d. 709) - General of the Guards during reign of Wu Zetian
3. Qibi Zhen (契苾贞) - Secretary of the Palace

== In popular media ==
He was portrayed in Korean TV drama series Yeon Gaesomun by Lee Kye-in in 2006-2007.
