= Yitewushi Khan =

Yitewushi Khan (伊特勿失可汗), personal name Duomozhi (咄摩支), was the last khan of the Xueyantuo.

Little is known about Duomozhi's background, other than that he was a nephew of Zhenzhu Khan. In 646, during the reign of Zhenzhu's son and successor, Duomi Khan, the Xueyantuo fell into a state of confusion due to a combination of attacks by the Tang dynasty, misrule by Duomi, and rebellions by the Uyghurs. Duomi was killed in a Uyghur attack, and the Xueyantuo forces collapsed. Some 70,000 people fled west and supported Duomozhi as Yitewushi Khan. Under Yitewushi, they returned east to their old territory, but, with the Uyghurs having taken much of the old Xueyantuo territory, Yitewushi soon renounced the title of khan, sending an emissary to the Tang to request permission to move to the area north of the Khangai Mountains.

Emperor Taizong of Tang initially sent the official Cui Dunli to try to comfort Duomozhi, but at the same time was concerned that if the Xueyantuo were rebuilt, it would cause problems for the Tang later. Meanwhile, tribes of the Chile confederation, which had previously been Xueyantuo vassals, did not want the Xueyantuo rebuilt either and reported their fear of that to Emperor Taizong. Emperor Taizong therefore sent the general Li Shiji with an army toward Duomozhi's location—with the instruction to accept Duomozhi's surrender if he wanted to surrender, and to attack if Duomozhi did not. Li soon arrived at the Khangai, and Duomozhi's assistant Tizhen (梯真) surrendered. Duomozhi fled to the south into the canyon. Li sent his subordinate Xiao Siye (蕭嗣業) to comfort him, and he surrendered to Xiao. Not all of his subordinates were willing to surrender, however, and Li attacked them, killing and capturing many of them.

In the fall of 646, Duomozhi was delivered to the Tang capital Chang'an. Emperor Taizong commissioned him as a general. Duomozhi died before Emperor Taizong's death in 649 and was said to have been mourned with honor.

== Notes and references ==
- Zizhi Tongjian, vol. 198.

Regnal titles
Preceded by Duomi Khan (Bazhuo)	Khan of Xueyantuo; 646	Succeeded by None (dynasty destroyed)
