= Xueyantuo =

Tribal confederation in the Eurasian Steppe (3rd cen. BC – 4th cen. CE)

- 628–723 (?–723 under Second Turkic Khaganate)
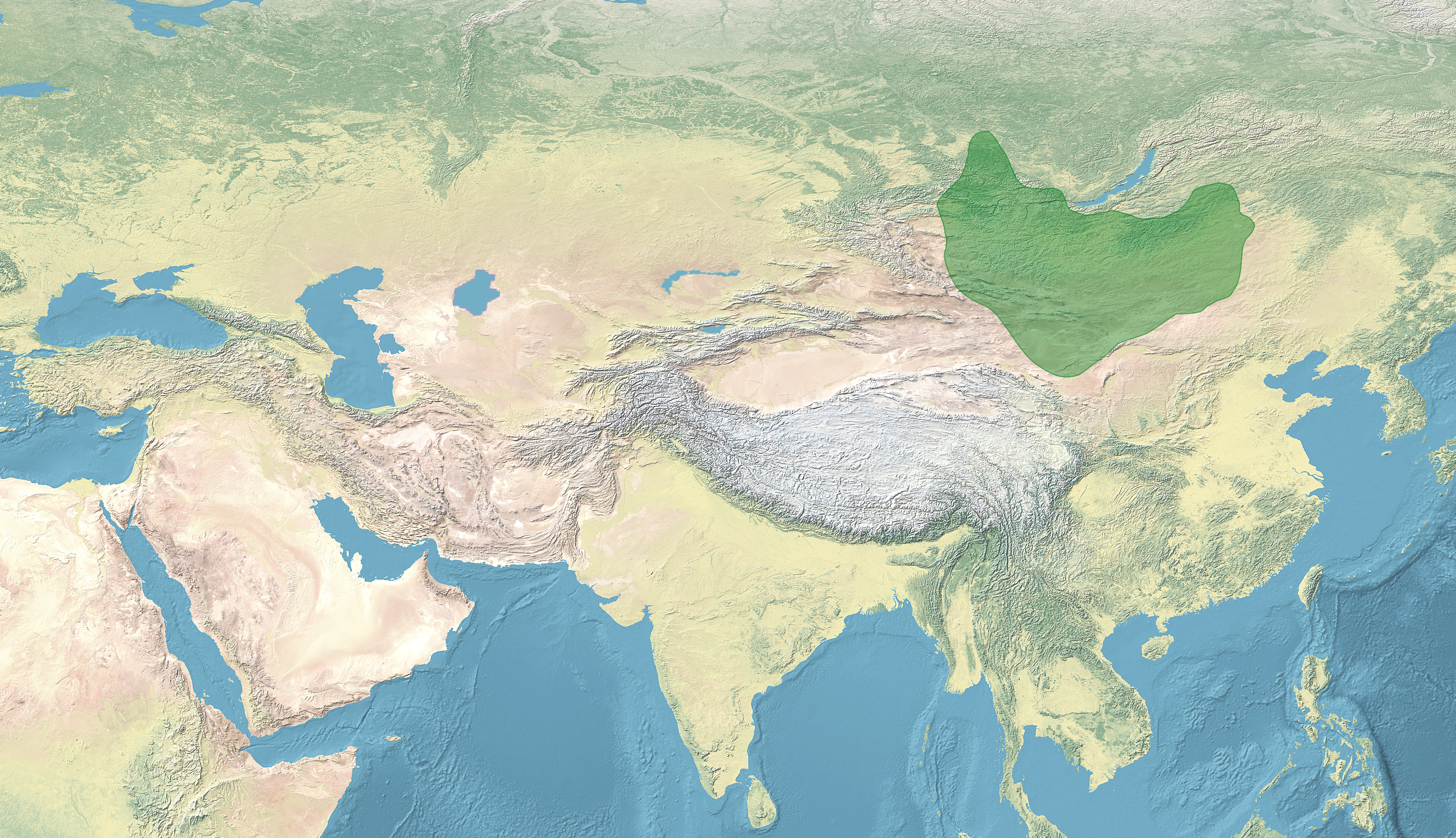
- Year 640, the Xueyantuo directly controlled areas.
- Capital: Ötüken
- Common languages: Old Turkic
- Religion: Tengrism
- Government: Tribal confederation
- Historical era: Middle Ages
  - Established: 628
  - Disestablished: 723 (?–723 under Second Turkic Khaganate)
Preceded by	Succeeded by
First Turkic Khaganate; Eastern Turkic Khaganate	Tang dynasty; Second Turkic Khaganate

Xueyantuo
- Chinese: 薛延陀
Transcriptions
Standard Mandarin
- Hanyu Pinyin: Xuēyántuó
- Wade–Giles: Hsüeh^{1}-yen^{2}-tʻo^{2}
- IPA: /ɕɥɛ⁵⁵ jɛn³⁵ tʰwɔ³⁵/
Middle Chinese
- Middle Chinese: /siᴇt̚ jiᴇn dɑ/

The Xueyantuo or Sir Tardush were an ancient Turkic tribe from the Tiele confederation and a khaganate in Northeast Asia who were at one point vassals of the Göktürks, later aligning with the Tang dynasty against the Eastern Turkic Khaganate.

== Names ==
=== Xue ===
Xue 薛 appeared earlier as Xinli 薪犁 in Sima Qian's Shiji, vol. 110 but were not referred to again until the 7th century. Golden (2011) proposed that 薛 Xue's Old Turkic form Sir derived from Sanskrit Śrī "fortunate, auspicious"

=== Yantuo ===
The etymology of Yantuo 延陀 is much debated. It was first identified with Tarduš, one of two divisions, besides Töliš, of the short-lived Xueyantuo Qaghanate, by Western Orientalists (like Vilhelm Thomsen) who considered Töliš and Tarduš to be tribal names. The ethnonym is thus reconstructable as Syr-Tardush. However, Chinese scholars viewed Töliš and Tarduš as names of political organizations or districts: for example, Cen Zhongmian viewed the Töliš-Tarduš division as east–west whereas Wang Jingru, citing the New Book of Tang, viewed Töliš-Tarduš as north–south.

Sergey Klyastorny (2003:305), apud Golden (2018), proposed that Xueyantuo transcribed *Sir-Yamtar; in contrast to the tribal name Sir, [Ïšβara] Yamtar appeared as a personal name of one companion of Kül Tigin, mentioned the eponymous inscription in his memory.

The Tongdian records the origin of Yantuo: "During the reign of Murong Jun in the Former Yan, the Xiongnu chanyu Helatou (賀剌頭, "the leader of the Alat tribe") led his tribe of thirty-five thousand people and came to surrender. Yantuo people are probably their descendants." Based on this, Bao (2010) proposed that Yantuo people were the descendants of the Alat tribe, also known as Hala-Yundluɣ; therefore, the name Yantuo was probably derived from Yundluɣ, and Xueyantuo can be reconstructed as Sir-Yundluɣ.

== History ==
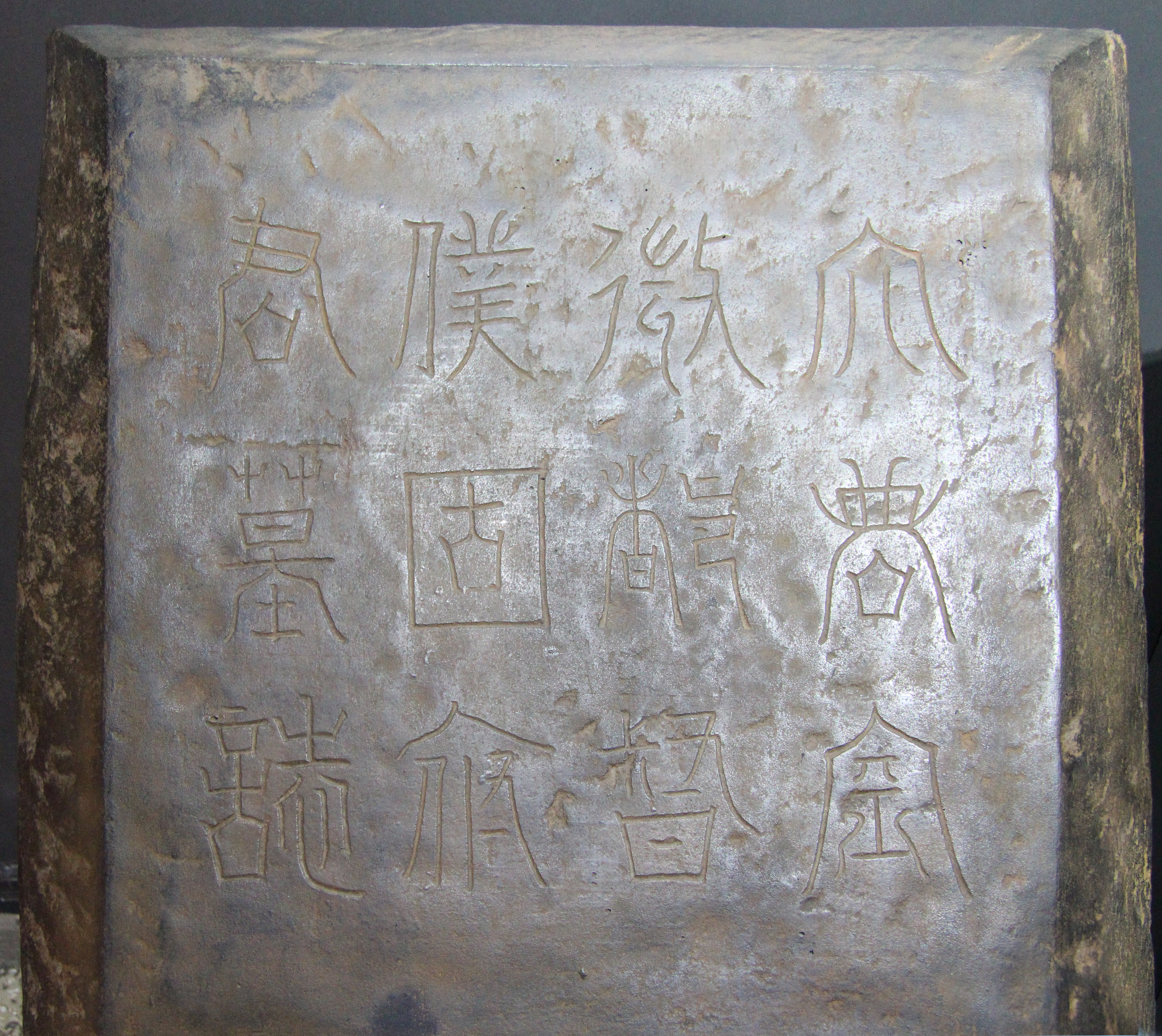
The epitaph of Pugu Yitu, a Xueyantuo who died in 678

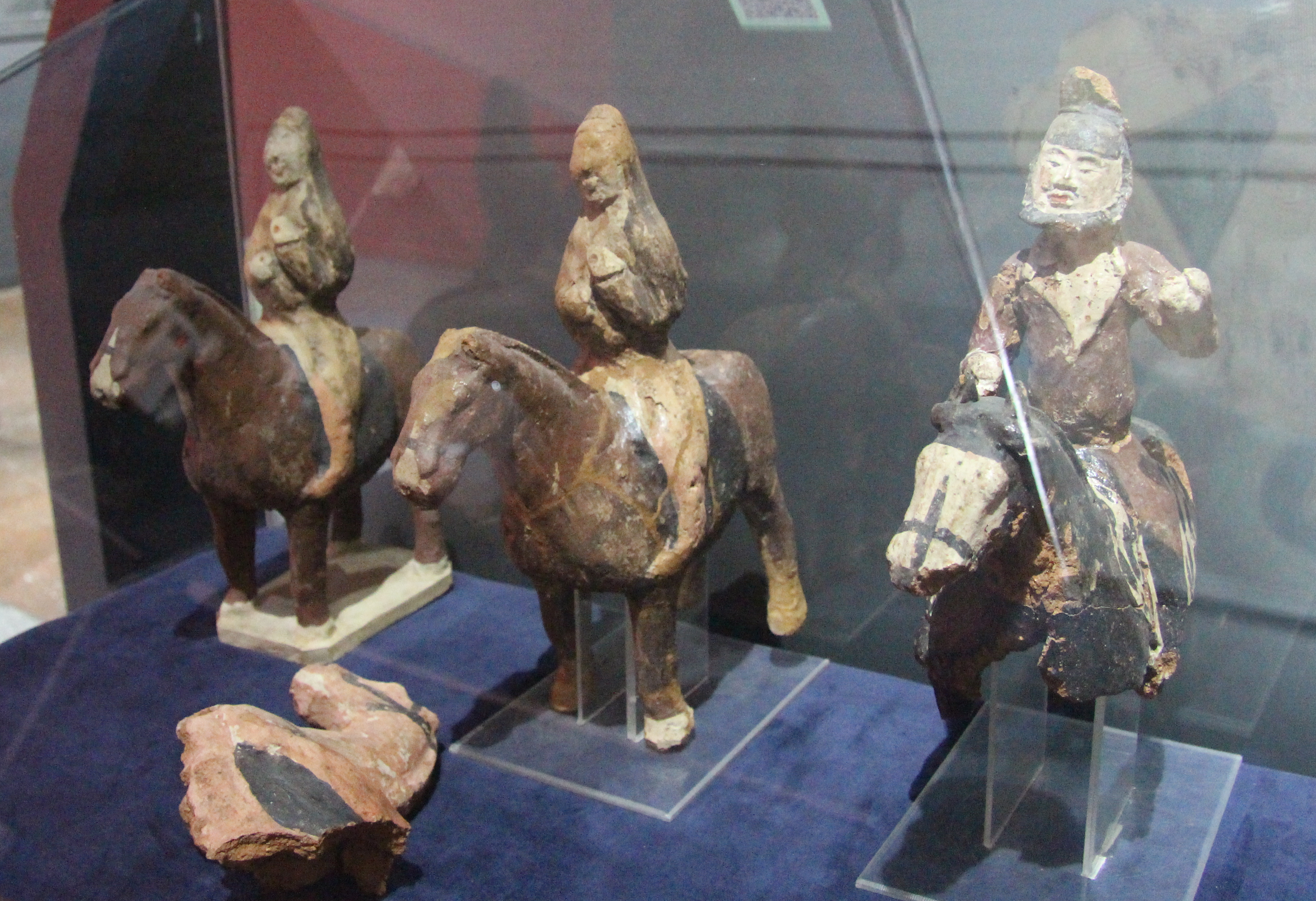
Cavalry figurines from the tomb of Pugu Yitu, a Xueyantuo leader

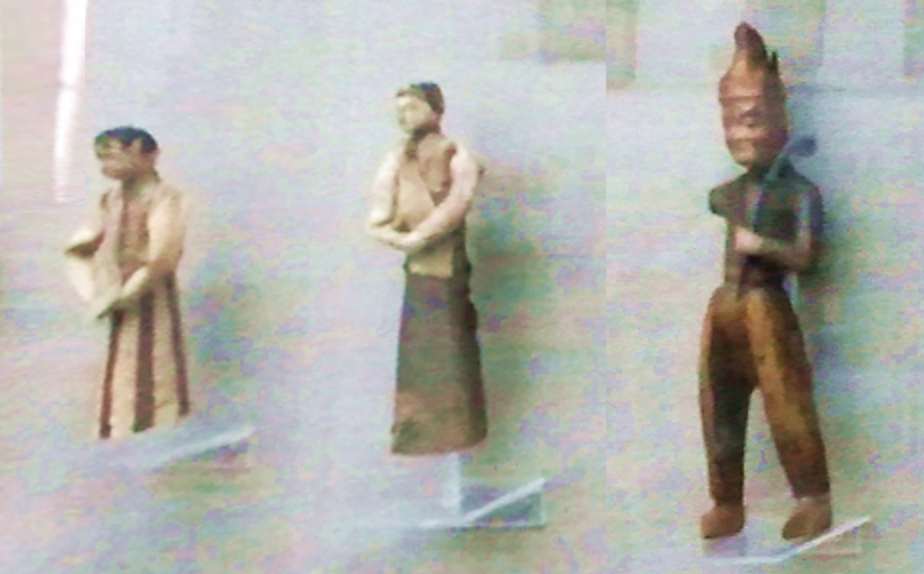
Ceramic figures from Shoroon Dov Kurgan, the tomb of Pugu Yitu, a Xueyantuo leader.

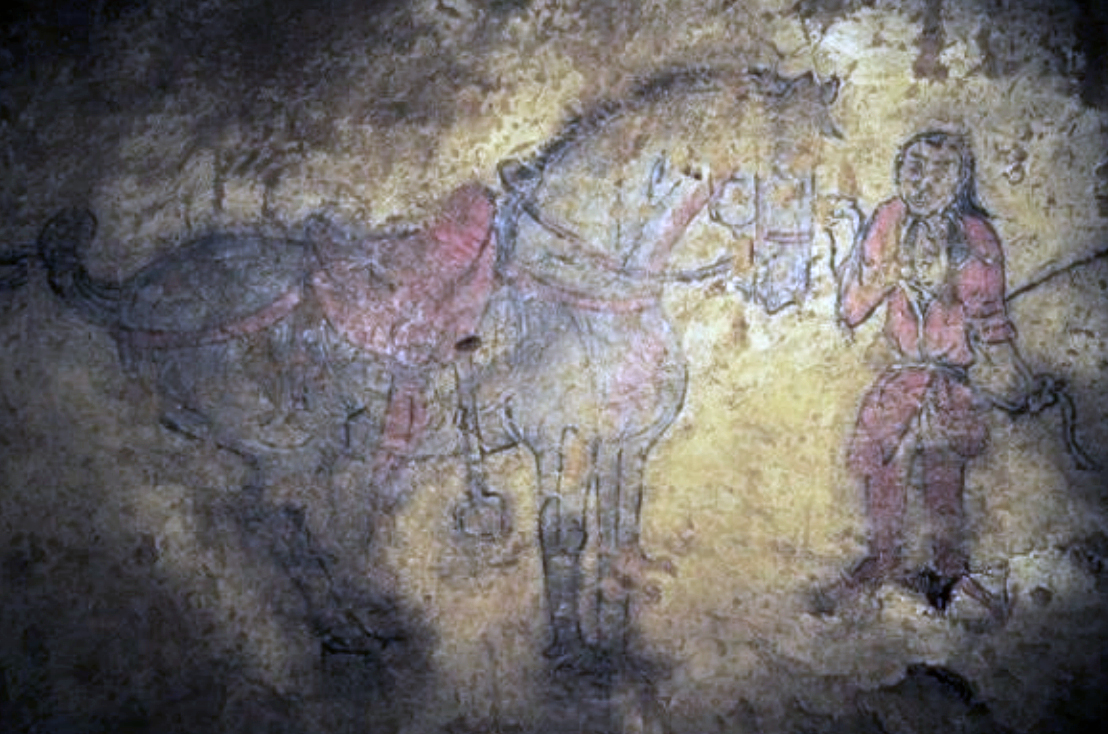
Painting from the Shoroon Bumbagar tomb

Initially the Xue and the Yantuo were two separate tribes. The Tongdian states that: "Xueyantuo is a splinter tribe from Tiele. In the time of Former Yan [emperor] Murong Jun, Xiongnu Shanyu Helatou led his tribe, numbering 35,000, to come surrender. Yantuo are probably their descendants. With the Xue tribe [Yantuo] live intermixed. Thus the appellation Xueyantuo. The Khagan clan's surname is Yilitu. For generations they have been a strong nation." The rulers of Xueyantuo claimed to be originally named Xue (薛/偰), and that the name of the tribe was changed to Xueyantuo after the Xue defeated and merged the Yantuo into their tribe.

After Yiedie Khan, the Xueyantuo founded a short-lived khaganate over the steppe under Zhenzhu Khan, his son Duomi Khan and nephew Yitewushi Khan, the last of whom eventually surrendered to the Tang dynasty.

In 605, Xueyantuo were attacked by the Western Turkic Khaganate under Heshana Qaghan. Consequently, they abandoned the Western Turks and established their own khaganate under a leadership of Qibi tribe's Yiwuzhenmohe Qaghan, retaining the control and income from the Turpan segment of the Silk Road. Later, Xueyantuo leader Yshbara was installed as a lesser kagan yetir (yeti er "seven tribes"). In 610, Shikui Khagan (r. 610–617) ascended to the Western Turkic throne, both rulers renounced their kagan ranks and rejoined the Western Turkic Khaganate. The next Western Turkic ruler, Tong Yabghu Qaghan (r. 618–628) annexed all seven tribes of the Xueyantuo-headed Tiele confederation, which also included Uyghur, Bayïrku, Ădiz, Tongra, Bugu and Barsil tribes. In 627 the Xueyantuo leader led his tribes into the territory of the Eastern Turkic Khaganate, defeated the main force of the khaganate led by the son of the reigning Illig Qaghan, Yukuk Shad, and settled in the valley of river Tola in the northern Mongolia. After the victory, Uyghur leader Yaoluoge Pusa assumed a title huo xielifa (Chinese: 活頡利發 *kat-elteber or *war-hilitber) and split from the confederation, and in 629 the Xueyantuo Yinan-erkin declared himself Inčü Bilge-Khagan of the new Xueyantuo Khaganate.

This Xueyantuo Khaganate was quickly recognized by the Tang Empire, as a counterweight against the Eastern Turkic Khaganate. "Raising Yi'nan on Kagan throne was done under pressure from the Tang court interested in stripping El-kagan of the rights to the supreme power in the huge region, and also in final dismemberment of the Turkic state, a source of many conflicts on their northern borders." Xueyantuo provided military service by assisting the Tang Empire against the Tatars in the 630s. The Xueyantuo's vast khaganate spanned from the Altai Mountains to the Gobi Desert.

=== Emperor Taizong's campaign against Eastern Tujue ===
On March 27, 630, the Xueyantuo allied with the Tang to defeat the Eastern Turkic Khaganate in the Yin Mountains. Illig Qaghan escaped, but was handed over to the Tang by his subordinate qaghan on May 2.

After Eastern Göktürks were defeated by Tang the Xueyantuo effectively took over control of the Eastern Göktürks' former territory, at times submissive to the Tang and at times warring with the Tang and the subsequent khan of the Eastern Göktürks that Tang supported, Qilibi Khan.

In 632 the Xueyantuo repulsed an army of Sy Yabghu Qaghan from the Western Turkic Khaganate, then subjugated the Karluks at the Ulungur and Irtysh Rivers, and then the Yenisei Kyrgyz tribes. In 634 one of their rivals, Dubu Qaghan (Ashina Shier), son of Ashina Xichun, who ruled much of the eastern half of the Western Turkic Khaganate, was eliminated before escaping to the Tang dynasty.

After that they maintained a friendly relationship with the Tang until 639, when a raid on the Tang capital was planned by the Gökturks under Ashina Jiesheshuai (阿史那结社率), who had been disparaged by the Tang emperor. He allied with his nephew Ashina Heluohu (阿史那贺逻鹘), choosing him as the leader of the raid on May 19. They were unsuccessful and over 40 rebels were executed. Heluohu was spared and expelled to the far south.

After this incident, an arraignment was made on August 13. All Goktürks north of Ordos were deported, in an attempt to restore the Eastern Turkic Khagante as a puppet against the Xueyanto, in an attempt to distract them from the territorial competition in the west.

Among the Göktürk nobles, Ashina Simo was selected as the qaghan (Qilibi Khan) with his capital at the border. The plot failed, as he was unable to gather his people, many of his tribesmen having escaped to the south by 644 after a series of unsuccessful incursions by the Xueyantuo supported by the Tang dynasty. Defeats by the advancing Tang troops had made their tribal allies lose confidence in them. The crisis deepened the next year when a coup d'état took place within the clan.

=== Emperor Taizong's campaign against Xueyantuo ===
On August 1, 646, the Xueyantuo were defeated by the Uyghurs (Huihe, 回纥) and the Tang. The Xueyantuo's Duomi Khan, was killed by the Uyghurs. A Tang army led by the general Li Daozong, the Prince of Jiangxia, crushed the Xueyantuo forces. The last Xueyantuo khan, the Yitewushi Khan Duomozhi, surrendered. Their remnants were destroyed two years later, on September 15. The Sir re-appeared later as [Al]tï Sir "Six Sir Tribes", subjects of the Second Turkic Khaganate ruler Bilge Qaghan; Klyashtorny controversially proposed that Sir were precursors to the Kipchaks.

The Xueyantuo's relationship with the later Shatuo Turks is contested. The epitaph of Shatuo leader Li Keyong states that his clan's progenitor was "Yidu, Lord of the Xueyantuo country, an unrivaled general" (益度、薛延陀國君、無敵將軍). However, Chinese chroniclers also traced the Shatuo's origins to a Tiele chief named *Bayar (拔也 Baye) ~ *Bayïrku (拔也古 Bayegu) or Western Turkic Chuyue 處月 (often identified with Chigils).

== Khans of Xueyantuo ==
- Yiedie Khan (也咥可汗) (?–628?)
- Zhenzhu Khan (真珠可汗) (628–645)
- Duomi Khan (多彌可汗) (645–646)
- Yitewushi Khan (伊特勿失可汗) (646)

=== Under Second Turkic Khaganate ===
- Küli Čur, Ïšbara Bilge Küli Čur (?–c. 723)

== Surname of Khans ==
The surname of Xueyantuo's khans is uncertain, although modern Chinese historian Bo Yang lists their surname as "Yishi" in his edition (also known as the Bo Yang Edition) of the Zizhi Tongjian.

According to Cen Zhongmian, the aforementioned names are related to a variant of elteris. Duan Lianqin asserted that the name Yishibo (Yiedie Khan) can also be read interchangeably as Yedie (也咥). The Zizhi Tongjian, in the original, referred to one ethnic Xueyantuo general named Duomo, possibly the Yitewushi Khan (after he became a Tang general) by the family name of Xue—although the Tang Huiyao indicated that it was not the same person, as it indicated that the Yitewushi Khan died during Emperor Taizong's reign.

== Surnames of Xueyantuo ==
- Li (李)
- Liu (刘)
- Xie (偰)
- Xue (薛)
- Zhang (張)

== See also ==
- Later Tang
- Selenga
- Sir-Kıvchak
- Timeline of the Turkic peoples (500–1300)
- Xue
