= Chebi Khan =

- Qaghan of the Eastern Turkic Khaganate
- Reign: 645–650
- Predecessor: Qilibi Khan
- Successor: Ashina Nishufu (claimant)
- Born: Ashina Hubo 阿史那斛勃
- Died: Unknown
- House: Ashina
- Religion: Tengrism

Chebi Khagan (Chinese: 車鼻可汗/车鼻可汗, Modern Chinese: (Pinyin): chēbí kěhàn, (Wade-Giles): ch'e-pi k'o-han, Middle Chinese (Guangyun) [tɕʰi̯a˥˩bʰi˩ kʰɑ˥ɣɑn˩˥]), reconstructed Old Turkic *Çavïş; personal name Ashina Hubo (阿史那斛勃, āshǐnà húbó, a-shih-na hu-po), full regal title Yizhuchebi Khagan (乙注車鼻可汗/乙注车鼻可汗, yǐzhù chēbí kěhàn, i-chu ch'e-pi k'o-han), was a claimant of the title of khan of the Eastern Turkic Khaganate after the collapse of the Xueyantuo, who was successful for some time in reconstituting Eastern Turkic Khaganate, until he was defeated and captured by the Tang dynasty general Gao Kan (高侃) in 650.

== Background ==
Ashina Hubo (later Chebi Khan) was said to be from minor branch of the Turkic imperial clan of Ashina, and his ancestors was said to have served for generations as subordinate khans to the great khans of Eastern Turkic Khaganate. His seat was near the Altai Mountains.

In 630, after the Eastern Turkic Khaganate collapsed and Illig Qaghan was captured by Tang dynasty forces commanded by Li Jing, the Xueyantuo, formerly an Eastern Turkic vassal, took over most of Eastern Turkic Khaganate's former lands. Some Eastern Turkic Khaganate remnants wanted to declare Ashina Hubo the khan of Eastern Turkic Khaganate, but due to the Xueyantuo's strength, Ashina Hubo did not declare himself khan and instead surrendered to the Xueyantuo. However, because Ashina Hubo was considered intelligent and capable, the Xueyantuo were apprehensive of Ashina Hubo and wanted to kill him. When Ashina Hubo heard this, he fled north and gathered his people, declaring himself Yizhuchebi Khan (Chebi Khan). He made periodic raids against the Xueyantuo and gradually grew stronger.

== Reign ==
In 646, Tang and Huige forces destroyed the Xueyantuo and Chebi Khan grew stronger, submitting the Yenisei Kyrgyz and Karluks. In 647, he sent his son Ashina Shaboluo (阿史那沙鉢羅) to China to greet Emperor Taizong of Tang and offering to visit Taizong himself. Taizong sent the generals An Diaozhe (安調遮) and Han Hua (韓華) to escort Ashina Hubo, but once they arrived at Ashina Hubo's headquarters, they realized that Chebi Khan had no intention of visiting Chang'an, despite strong advocacy by Chebi Khan's son Ashina Jieman (阿史那羯漫). Han conspired with the Karluks –a vassal tribe of Chebi Khan– and their chief Nishu Kül Elteber to seize Chebi Khan and take him back to the Tang. When Chebi Khan discovered this, Ashina Hubo's son Ashina Zhebi (阿史那陟苾) killed Han in combat, and An was also killed. Ashina Jieman, who had command of a substantial portion of Chebi Khan's people, instead sent his own son Ashina Anshuo (阿史那菴鑠) to the Tang to show submission.

== Capture ==
In 649 Emperor Taizong sent the general Gao Kan, supplemented by forces from the Uighur (Ch. Huige) and Pugu (僕骨) tribes, made a surprise attack on Chebi Khan. Once Gao's forces entered Eastern Turkic territory, Eastern Turkic vassals began to surrender, as did Ashina Jieman. In 650, Gao approached Chebi Khan's headquarters, and Chebi Khan tried to summon the vassal tribes for aid, but drew no response. He tried to flee with his favorite concubine, but was captured by Gao. Gao took him back to Chang'an, where he was spared by Emperor Taizong's son and successor Emperor Gaozong and given a general title. His territory was divided under three Tang commandants and 24 prefectures, with various tribal chiefs as commandants and prefects. There were no further historical records about Chebi Khan, including when he died.

== Issue ==
- Ashina Shaboluo (阿史那沙鉢羅)
- Ashina Jieman (阿史那羯漫)
  - Ashina Anshuo (阿史那菴鑠)
- Ashina Zhebi (阿史那陟苾)

Chebi Khan Ashina Clan
Preceded by Qilibi Khan	Khagan of the Eastern Turkic Khaganate; ~646–650	Succeeded by Ashina Nishoufu
