= Eastern Turkic Khaganate =

Former empire in the 6th and 7th centuries

- 581–645
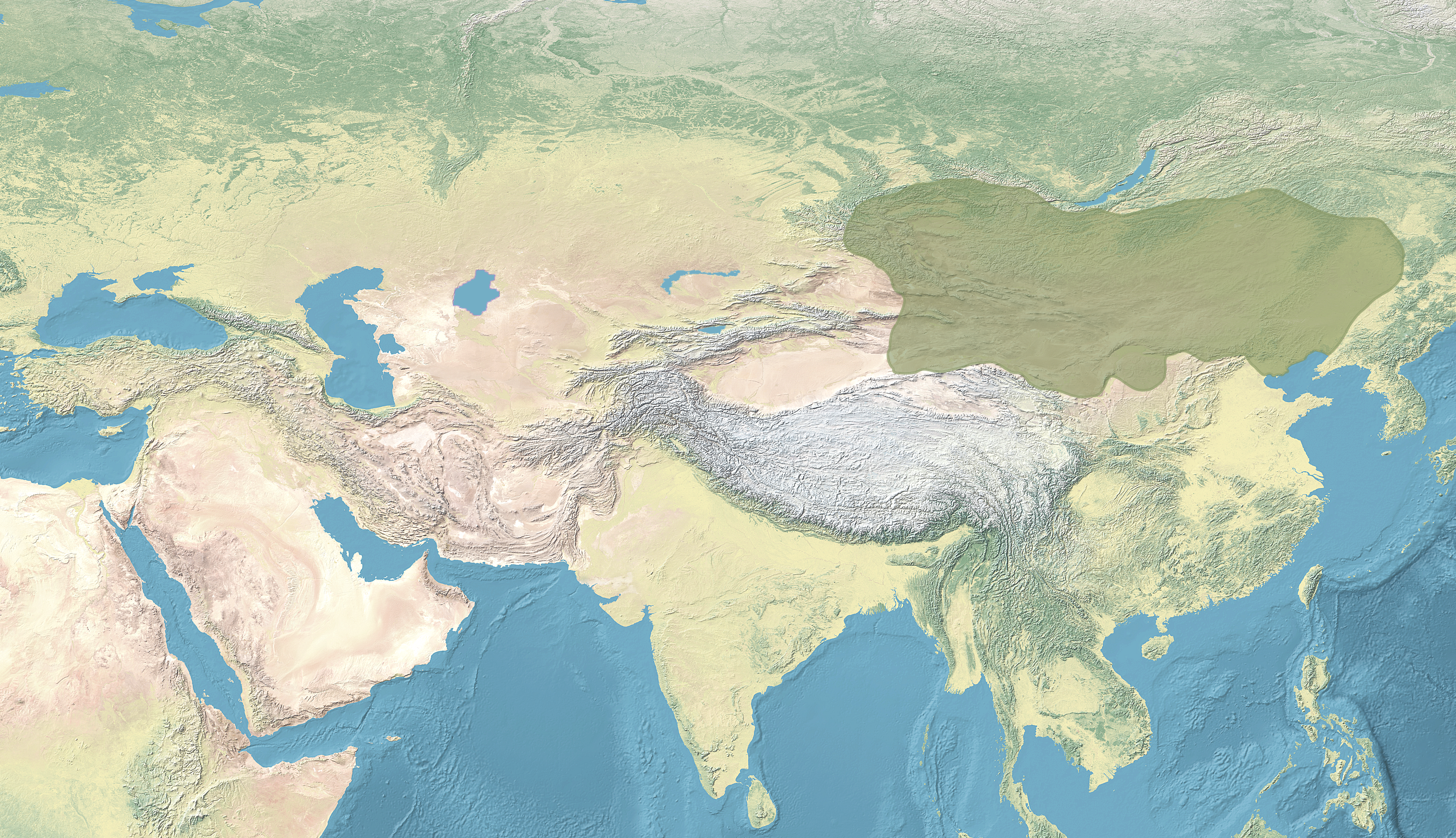
- Greatest extent of the Eastern Turkic Khaganate
- Status: Administrative division of the First Turkic Khaganate (581–603); Independent khaganate (603–630); Vassal khaganate of the Tang dynasty (630–639); Buffer state of the Tang dynasty (639–645)
- Capital: Ötüken
- Common languages: Old Turkic; Rouran; Middle Chinese
- Religion: Tengrism, Buddhism
- Khagan
  - 603–609: Yami Qaghan
  - 620–630: Illig Qaghan
  - 645–650: Chebi Khan

Establishment
- Historical era: Early Middle Ages
  - Göktürk civil war, Eastern Khaganate founded: 581
  - East-West split: 603
  - Conquest by Tang dynasty: 630
  - Empire reestablished: 639
  - Reconquest by Tang dynasty: 645
  - Second Turkic Khaganate established: 682

Area
- 624: 4,000,000 km^{2} (1,500,000 sq mi)
Preceded by
First Turkic Khaganate
Succeeded by
Xueyantuo
Protectorate General to Pacify the North
Second Turkic Khaganate
- Today part of: China; Kazakhstan; Mongolia; Russia

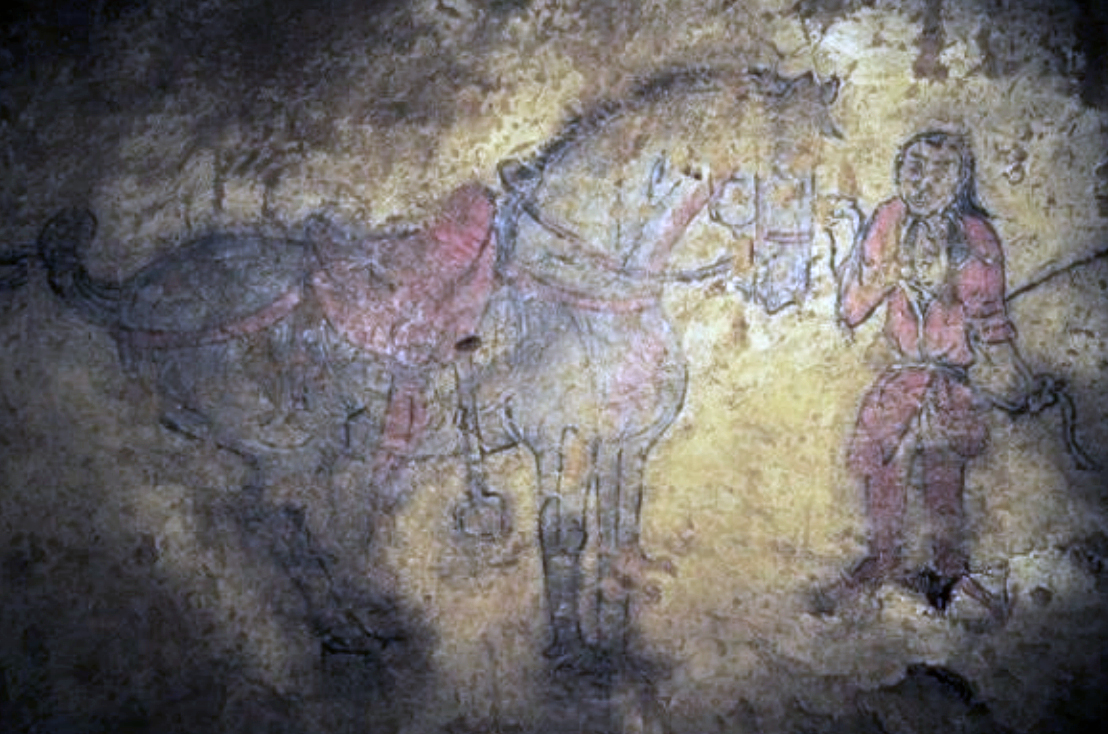
Shoroon Bumbagar tomb mural, Göktürk, 7th century CE, in modern-day Mongolia.

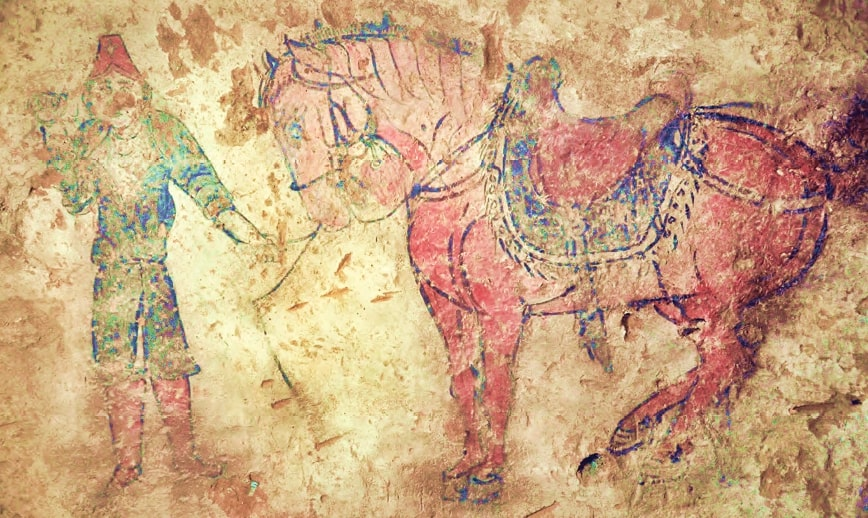
Shoroon Bumbagar tomb mural, Göktürk, 7th century CE, Mongolia.

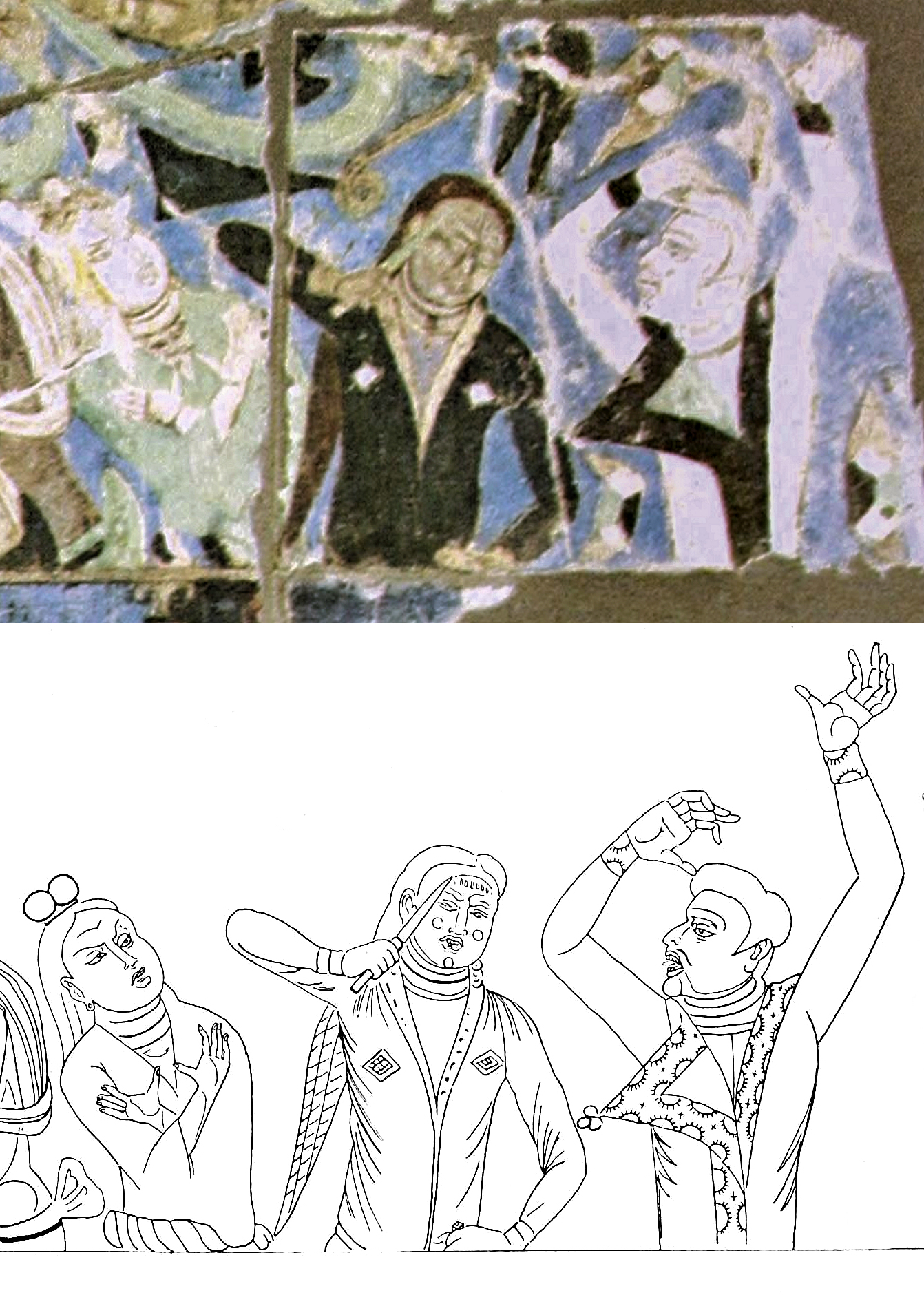
A Turk mourning the Buddha, Kyzyl, Mingoi, Maya cave.

The Eastern Turkic Khaganate (Chinese: 東突厥; pinyin: Dōng Tūjué or Dōng Tújué) was formed as a result of the destructive wars in the beginning of the 7th century (AD 581–603) after the First Turkic Khaganate (founded in the 6th century in the Mongolian Plateau by the Ashina clan) had splintered into two polities – one in the east, one in the west. The Eastern Turkic Khaganate was defeated and absorbed by the Tang dynasty, and Xueyantuo occupied the territory of the former Turkic Khaganate.

== History ==
=== Outline ===
In 552–555 the Göktürks replaced the Rouran Khaganate as the dominant power on the Mongolian Plateau, forming the First Turkic Khaganate (552–630). They quickly spread west to the Caspian Sea. Between 581 and 603 the Western Turkic Khaganate in Central Asia separated from the Eastern Khaganate in the Mongolian Plateau. In the early period the Central Plain regimes were weak and paid tribute to the Göktürks at times. The Tang dynasty overthrew the Eastern Turkic Khaganate in 630.

=== Before the Khaganate ===
The ethnonym Türk (pl. Türküt, > Middle Chinese as 突厥: early * dwət-kuɑt > late * tɦut-kyat > Mandarin Tūjué or Tújué) is ultimately derived from the Old-Turkic migration-term 𐱅𐰇𐰼𐰰 Türük/Törük, which means "created, born", from the Old Turkic word root * türi-/töri- 'tribal root, (mythic) ancestry; take shape, to be born, be created, arise, spring up' and derived with the Old Turkic suffix 𐰰 (-ik), perhaps from Proto-Turkic * türi-k "lineage, ancestry", (compare also the Proto-Turkic word root * töre- to be born, originate). or "strong", or originally a noun and meant "'the culminating point of maturity (of a fruit, human being, etc.), but more often used as an [adjective] meaning (of a fruit) "just fully ripe"; (of a human being) "in the prime of life, young, and vigorous"".

The Chinese Book of Zhou (7th century) presents an etymology of the name Turk as derived from "helmet", explaining that this name comes from the shape of a mountain where they worked in the Altai Mountains. Hungarian scholar András Róna-Tas (1991) pointed to a Khotanese-Saka word, tturakä "lid", semantically stretchable to "helmet", as a possible source for this folk etymology, yet Golden thinks this connection requires more data.

In 439 a man with the surname Ashina led 500 families west from Gansu to Gaochang near Turfan. In about 460 the Rouran moved them east to the Altai, which was an important source of metalwork for Siberia and Mongolia. David Christian says that the first dated mention of "Turk" appears in Chinese annals in 542 when they made annual raids across the Yellow River when it froze over. In 545 the future Bumin Qaghan was negotiating directly with the Western Wei (535–557) without regard to his Rouran overlords. Later the Turks were sent east to suppress a rebellion by the Kao-ch'e, but the Turks absorbed them into their own army. Bumin demanded a royal bride from the Rouran and was denounced as a "blacksmith slave". Bumin took a bride from the Western Wei, defeated the Rouran ruler in Jehol and took the royal title of Khagan (552).

Strictly speaking, the politonym Kök Tür(ü)k "Blue ~ Heavenly Turks", found on the Orkhon inscriptions, only denotes the Eastern Turks, as Old Turkic kök means "heaven, blue" and signifies the cardinal direction east. The Uyghurs, another people contemporary to Eastern Turks' Latter Göktürk successors, were also Turkic speakers yet used Türük to denote Latter Göktürks, not themselves. Chinese chroniclers used 突厥 Tūjué or Tújué to denote First Turkic Khaganate, the Eastern Turks, as well as peoples politically associated with Eastern Turks such as: the "Wooden-Horse Tujue" (including the Tuvans, whom Book of Sui and History of the Northern Dynasties listed as a Tiele tribe), the Tujue Sijie 突厥思結 (a tribe who were also members of the Tiele and later Toquz Oghuz), as well as the Shatuo Tujue 沙陀突厥 and Khazars (突厥曷薩 Tūjué Hésà or Tújué Hésà; 突厥可薩部 Tūjué Kěsà bù or Tújué Kěsà bù), as well as the Shatuo's and Khazars' predecessors, the Western Turks 西突厥 Xī Tūjué or Xī Tújué, who were not named as Türük, but On-Ok "Ten Arrows, Ten Tribes" in the Orkhon inscriptions. Only later would Islamic chroniclers use Turks to denote Inner Asian nomadic peoples, and then modern historians would use Turks to refer to all peoples speaking Turkic languages, differentiated from non-Turkic speakers.

=== Nominal unity (552–581) ===
The west was given to Bumin's younger brother Istämi (552–575) and his son Tardu (575–603). Ishtami expanded the empire to the Caspian and the Oxus river. The Göktürks gained the Tarim Basin and thus the Silk Road trade and the Sogdian merchants that managed it. Bumin died in 552, the same year he rebelled, and was followed by three of his sons. Issik Qaghan (552–553) reigned briefly. Muqan Qaghan (553–572) finished off the remaining Rouran (who resisted until 555), pushed the Kitans east and controlled the Yenisei Kyrgyz. He was followed by Taspar Qaghan (572–581). The Eastern Turks extracted a large amount of booty and tribute from the Western Wei (535–557) and Northern Zhou (557–581) dynasties, including 100,000 rolls of silk annually, which they tried to sell in Central Asia.

=== East-West split (581–603) ===
In 581 the Sui dynasty was founded and began to reunify China proper. The Sui began pushing back, generally by supporting or bribing one faction against the other. Taspar died the same year the Sui dynasty was founded. The three claimants were the sons of the three previous rulers. Taspar chose Muqan's son Apa Qaghan, but the elders rejected this and chose Taspar's son Anluo (581). Anluo soon yielded to Issik's son Ishbara Qaghan (581–587). Anluo became insignificant and Apa and Ishbara fought it out. In 584 Ishbara attacked Apa and drove him west to Tardu, who ruled what was becoming the Western Khaganate. Apa and Tardu then drove Ishbara east. He submitted to the Sui and with Sui support drove Apa west into Tardu's territory. In 587 both Apa and Ishbara died during the Göktürk civil war. Ishbara was followed east by his brother Bagha Qaghan (587–588) who was followed by Ishbara's son Tulan Qaghan (588–599). In 587 Tulan stopped paying tribute to the Sui and two years later was assassinated. Tardu moved from the west and briefly reunified the Turkic empire (599–603). The Sui supported his rivals so he attacked the Sui dynasty. The Sui poisoned the wells forcing him to retreat.

=== Independence (603–630) ===
The empire was split again in 603. The east went to Yami Qaghan (603–609) as a sort of Sui vassal. He admired Han culture and had the Han people build him a house in the Ordos country.

As the Sui dynasty's power waned, some individuals agreed to become vassals of Shibi Qaghan (609–619) and adopted Turkic-style titles, as well as the Khaganate's wolf's-head banners. In 615, the Sui lured his Sogdian advisor into a trap and killed him. He stopped paying tribute and briefly besieged Emperor Yang of Sui in Shanxi.

In 615 Emperor Yang assigned Li Yuan, who would later become the first emperor of the Tang dynasty, the seemingly impossible task of protecting the Sui dynasty's northern border. In 617, when tens of thousands of Turks reached Taiyuan, they found the gates open and the city suspiciously quiet. Fearing an ambush, the Turk's retreated. Li Yuan's deception had been successful and he quickly pressed his advantage offering the Turks "prisoners of war, women, jade and silks" in return for their friendship. The Turks declined, demanding instead that Li Yuan become a "Son of Heaven" and accept a Turkic title and banner.

Shibi's younger brother Chuluo (619–620) ruled for only 18 months. The next brother, Illig Qaghan (620–630), was the last independent ruler. He led yearly raids against the new Tang dynasty (618–907). In 626, he reached the gates of Chang'an. Emperor Taizong of Tang, who had just overthrown his father, chose to pay an enormous ransom. Taizong waited and enlarged his cavalry. In 627–629, an unusual cold led to mass livestock deaths and famine. Instead of lowering taxes, Illig raised them. The Xueyantuo, Uyghurs, Bayegu and some of Illig's people rebelled and in 629 were joined by the Khitans and Taizong. Six Tang armies attacked on a 1,200 km (750 mi) front in the Tang campaign against the Eastern Turks. Illig was captured in 630.

=== After the First Khaganate (630–683) ===
After the fall of the Khaganate Zhenzhu Khan (629–645) of the Xueyantuo ruled much of the north. Taizong made the Ashina live inside the Ordos Loop. In 639, after Ashina Jiesheshuai attempted to assassinate Emperor Taizong, Taizong made them live between the Yellow River and Gobi under Qilibi Khan (639–643) as a buffer state between China and the Xueyantuo. In 642 the Xueyantuo drove them south of the river. Zhenzhu's son Duomi Khan (645–646) planned to attack China. Taizong allied with the Uyghurs and broke up the Xueyantuo clan. The Ashina Chebi Khan (646–650) tried to revive the Khaganate but was captured by the Chinese and Uyghurs. Two more attempts by Ashina Nishufu (679–680) and Ashina Funian (680–681) failed. Turkic power was restored by the Second Turkic Khaganate (682–744), and then by the Uyghur Khaganate (744–840).

== See also ==
- Göktürk family tree
- Timeline of the Turkic peoples (500–1300)
- Turkic peoples
- Turks in the Tang military
