= Zhenzhu Khan =

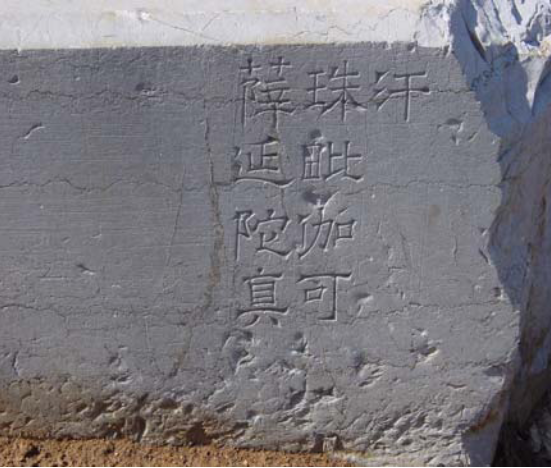
- The stone base inscribed with the name and regnal title of Zhenzhu Khan in Zhaoling (Xiuqin Zhou, 1999)

Khan of Xueyantuo
- Reign: 628–645
- Predecessor: Yiedie Khan
- Successor: Duomi Khan
- Born: Yishi Yinan (乙失夷男)
- Died: 21 October 645
- Issue: Yemang; Bazhuo
Regnal name
- Chinese: 真珠毗伽可汗; pinyin: Zhēnzhū Píjiā Kèhán; Old Turkic: 𐰘𐰃𐰨𐰇 𐰋𐰃𐰠𐰏𐰀 𐰴𐰍𐰣, romanized: Yinčü Bilge Qaɣan, lit. 'Pearl Wise Khan').

Zhenzhu Khan (Chinese: 真珠可汗; pinyin: Zhēnzhū Kèhán; lit. 'Pearl Khan', the Chinese rendering of Old Turkic: 𐰘𐰃𐰨𐰇 𐰴𐰍𐰣, romanized: Yinčü Qaɣan, lit. 'Pearl Khan') (died October 21, 645) was a khan of the Xueyantuo, under whom the Xueyantuo rose from being a vassal of the Eastern Turkic Khaganate to a khanate ruling over northern and central Asia. His personal name was recorded as Yishi Yinan (Chinese: 乙失夷男; pinyin: Yǐshī Yínán), the latter being Chinese rendering of Inan. He was later bestowed with the full regal title Zhenzhupijia Khan (Chinese: 真珠毗伽可汗; pinyin: Zhēnzhū Píjiā Kèhán, the Chinese rendering of Old Turkic: 𐰘𐰃𐰨𐰇 𐰋𐰃𐰠𐰏𐰀 𐰴𐰍𐰣, romanized: Yinčü Bilge Qaɣan, lit. 'Pearl Wise Khan').

During his reign, the Xueyantuo largely aligned with the Tang dynasty, even though the two states were at odds at times, with the most serious dispute involving the Tang's attempt to reestablish Eastern Turkic Khaganate as a vassal state under the Qilibi Khan — an attempt that eventually failed due to frequent incursions by the Xueyantuo army against the Turks. Throughout his reign, the Xueyantuo remained powerful despite Tang attempts to curb their power, but after Zhenzhu's death, a succession dispute between his sons, Bazhuo and Yemang (曳莽), led to Bazhuo killing Yemang and subsequently internal unrest. Further, Bazhuo attacked the Tang, resulting in a major Tang retaliatory campaign that, along with a revolt by the Uyghurs, led to the Xueyantuo's destruction in 646.

== As tribal chief ==
Inan's birthdate is unknown, but it is known that he was the grandson of Yiedie Khan, the first ruler of the Xueyantuo, then a constituent tribe of the Tiele confederation, which was then submitting to the rule of the Eastern Turkic Khaganate. He had a brother named Tong Tegin. At the time Inan was Xueyantuo's ruler under Illig Qaghan, Inan had 70,000 tents of households.

By 627, several of the stronger members of the Tiele, including the Xueyantuo, Uyghurs, and Bayegu (拔野谷) rebelled. Illig Qaghan sent his son Yukuk Shad to attack the rebels with some 400,000 horsemen, but were defeated by an army of only 5,000 horsemen commanded by the Uyghur chieftain Pusar. At the same time, the Xueyantuo also defeated four Turkic generals, and Illig could not respond adequately. Illig then sent his subordinate Ashina Shibobi, against the Tiele, but the Uyghurs and Xueyantuo both defeated Shibobi, causing him to flee. Illig's subsequent anger at and brief detention of Shibobi eventually led to Shibobi also rebelling and entering into an alliance with the Tang.

== Reign ==
By late 628, the northern vassals of the Turks had all rebelled, and submitted to Inan, offering him the title of khan. Inan initially declined the title, not daring to use it. As Emperor Taizong of Tang wanted to enter into an alliance with the Xueyantuo against the Eastern Turks, he sent the general Qiao Shiwang (喬師望) as an envoy to Inan, recognizing him as the Zhenzhupiqie Khan (or Zhenzhu Khan in short), and awarding him with drums and banners. Zhenzhu Khan was very pleased, and he offered tribute to Emperor Taizong. According to the Chinese annals, by this point, his territory stretched from the Mohe to the east, the Western Turks to the west, and the Gobi Desert to the south, and that many tribes, including Uyghurs, Bayegu (拔也古), Adie (阿跌), Tongluo (同羅), Pugu (僕骨), and Barsils, all submitted to him. He established his power base in Ötüken, the traditional capital of Turks.

In August 629, he sent his brother Tong Tegin to offer tribute to Emperor Taizong, and Taizong, in return, awarded him with a sword and a whip, stating, "Lord, if your subordinates commit crimes, you can use the sword to execute those with major crimes, and whip those with minor crimes." Zhenzhu was pleased, and this brought fear in Illig, who requested a marriage with the Tang imperial clan, to no avail.

In 630, a Tang army commanded by the general Li Jing defeated the Eastern Turks, capturing Illig. Some of the Eastern Turks surrendered to the Tang; some surrendered to the Xueyantuo; and some fled to the west to the Western Turks or the nearby city states. The Xueyantuo were now the predominant power to the north of the Tang empire.

=== Reign over former Eastern Turk territory ===
As the supreme ruler over the former Eastern Turk territory, Zhenzhu tried to maintain peaceful relationship with the Tang by formally submitting to them, while at the same time strengthening his state. In 632, the Western Turks' Sy Yabghu Qaghan attacked the Xueyantuo, and Xueyantuo forces defeated him, contributing to his subsequent downfall.

Another challenge that Zhenzhu had to face was an attack from the Eastern Turk prince Ashina She'er, who had, during the collapse of the Eastern Turks, fled to the Western Turks and taken over a part of their territory, claiming the title of Dubu Khagan. As Ashina She'er viewed the Xueyantuo as the source of the Eastern Turks' downfall, he vowed revenge against the Xueyantuo in c. 634, with indecisive results. However, at that time a new Western Turkic khan, Ishbara Tolis, had just taken the throne, and a large portion of Ashina She'er's people, not willing to continue fighting, fled to him allowing the Xueyantuo to counterattack and defeat Ashina She'er.

Meanwhile, Zhenzhu was strengthening, and by 638, he was said to have more than 200,000 soldiers under him. It was also said that he had divided the army to be separately commanded by his sons Bazhuo and Jialibi (頡利苾), with Bazhuo in charge of the south and Jialibi in charge of the north. Emperor Taizong, believing that the Xueyantuo were becoming strong and difficult to subjugate, made both Bazhuo and Jialibi subordinate khans under their father, awarding them both drums and banners, ostensibly to honor them, but hoping to instead cause dissent between them.

Meanwhile, Qu Wentai (麴文泰), the king of Gaochang, was rumored to have allied himself with the Western Turks against the Tang, and also tried to engage the Xueyantuo in their alliance, sending an emissary to Zhenzhu to incite him to invade China. Zhenzhu, in response, informed Emperor Taizong of Qu's instigation and, when Emperor Taizong sent the general Hou Junji to attack Gaochang in 638, offered to send an army to guide Hou. Emperor Taizong sent the official Tang Jian and the general Zhishi Sili (執失思力) to the Xueyantuo, to award Zhenzhu with silk for his loyalty and to discuss coordination. (However, when Hou attacked and conquered Gaochang in 639, it appeared to be without the participation of the Xueyantuo.)

In 639, there was a failed plot led by the Eastern Turkic prince Ashina Jiesheshuai to assassinate Emperor Taizong. Taizong thereafter rethought his policy of settling the Eastern Turks inside Tang borders, instituted initially in 630. He made the Eastern Turkic prince Ashina Simo Qilibi Khan, ordering him to take the Eastern Turkic people and settle between the Yellow River and the Gobi. He sent Guo Siben, Chief Minister of Granaries to Zhenzhu, explaining the reasons and ordering the Xueyantuo to keep peace with the rebuilt Eastern Turkic Khaganate. Zhenzhu, who was reminded that he was the senior khagan, while displeased with the action, agreed to buy time, and by 641, Qilibi Khan had settled near Dingxiang (定襄, in modern Hohhot, Inner Mongolia).

== War with the Tang ==
Later that year, believing that Emperor Taizong was about to offer sacrifices to heaven and earth at Mount Tai and would take his soldiers with them, Zhenzhu Khan wanted to use this chance to destroy the Turks. He made his son dadu shad (大度設), with an army made of soldiers from the Tongluo, Pugu, Uyghurs, Mohe, and Xi, to attack the Eastern Turks with 200,000 men. Qilibi Khan could not resist Zhenzhu's forces, and withdrew within the Great Wall, took up position at Shuo Prefecture (roughly modern Shuozhou, Shanxi), and sought emergency aid from Taizong.

In the winter of 641, Taizong sent the generals Zhang Jian, Li Shiji, Li Daliang, Zhang Shigui (張士貴), and Li Xiyu (李襲譽), to attack the Xueyantuo to try to defend the Turks. He appointed Minister of War Li Shiji as the chief commander of the Shuozhou campaign, leading 60,000 soldiers and 1,200 cavalry to camp at Yufang. Li Daliang was appointed commander of the Lingzhou campaign, leading 40,000 soldiers and 5,000 cavalry to camp at Lingwu. Zhang Shigui led 17,000 soldiers as commander of the Qingzhou campaign, departing from Yunzhong. Governor of Liangzhou, Li Xiyu, was appointed commander of the Liangzhou campaign, advancing from the west. Taizong also instructed Qilibi to pursue scorched earth tactics. The Xueyantuo on the other hand, trained their troops in infantry combat, forming units of five where one person had a horse while the other four fought on foot. If victorious, they would mount their horses to pursue the fleeing enemy.

In December 641, Li Shiji engaged the Dadu Shad's army on Nuozhen river (modern Aibag river, Inner Mongolia). The Dadu Shad's army was initially able to kill Li Shiji's Turkic army's horses with arrows, but Li Shiji's lieutenant Xue Wanche (薛萬徹) was able to, in turn, concentrate on attacking the Xueyantuo army's horse handlers. Li Shiji defeated Dadu Shad killing over 3,000 and capturing more than 50,000. The Dadu Shad, however, was able to escape. Although Taizong was planning a full campaign, Wei Zheng advised against it, leading to the decision to refrain from further military action against the Xueyantuo. Instead, Taizong sent the emissary back to Zhenzhu with harsh words, but did not make further attacks on the Xueyantuo or rebuke Zhenzhu any further.

== Marriage proposal to the Tang ==
Later Zhenzhu had sent an emissary to Emperor Taizong, offering peace with the Eastern Turks and the Tang. He sent his uncle Ishbara Nishu Irkin (Chinese: 沙缽羅泥孰俟斤; pinyin: Shābōluó Níshú Qíjīn) to Taizong in 642, offering a tribute of 3,000 horses, 38,000 mink coats, and a mirror made of amber. Meanwhile, with the Tang general Qibi Heli—the chief of the Qibi tribe, a constituent tribe of the Tiele as well—being detained by the Xueyantuo after he, on a visit back to his tribe, was seized by his own subordinates and taken to the Xueyantuo (as his subordinates wanted to submit to the Xueyantuo rather than the Tang), Taizong, concerned about Qibi Heli's safety (as Qibi Heli had refused to submit to the Xueyantuo, cutting off an ear to show his resolve, causing Zhenzhu to nearly execute him), under advise of Fang Xuanling, agreed to the marriage proposal, sending the official Cui Dunli to negotiate the terms with Zhenzhu, under which Taizong's daughter Princess Xinxing (新興公主) would marry Zhenzhu, in exchange for Qibi Heli's release.

In 643, Zhenzhu accepted these terms and sent his nephew Tuli Shad (Chinese: 突利設; pinyin: Tūlì Shè) to offer tribute of 50,000 horses, 10,000 cattle or camels, and 100,000 goats, to serve as a bride price. Taizong welcomed Tuli in a grand ceremony, and Tuli held a great banquet in Taizong's honor, which Taizong and his officials personally attended. However, at Qibi's urging, Taizong considered renouncing the marriage—initially ordering Zhenzhu to personally meet him and Princess Xinxing at Ling Prefecture (靈州, roughly modern Yinchuan, Ningxia) to marry her, believing that Zhenzhu would refuse and that he would then have a good excuse to break off the marriage. When Zhenzhu agreed to go to Ling Prefecture, Taizong found another excuse—that the bride price offered had not been collected in full (as, in order to gather the livestock making up the bride price, Zhenzhu had to collect them from subordinate tribes, and it was taking longer than thought, and the livestock were also dying from having to go through the Gobi) to cancel the marriage treaty, despite strong opposition from his official Chu Suiliang, who pointed out that, effectively, he was devaluing his own words. Taizong rationalized his decision by arguing that if Zhenzhu had married a Tang princess, he would have greater legitimacy over the Tiele tribes and would be more difficult to control.

== End of reign ==
Meanwhile, Zhenzhu continued to attack the Eastern Turks periodically. When Emperor Taizong sent emissaries to try to stop him from doing so, Zhenzhu reportedly responded:

With the Supreme One's command, how dare I disobey! However, the Turks are unpredictable and have repeatedly invaded China, killing tens of thousands each year. When Your Majesty conquered them, they should have been enslaved and gifted to the Chinese people. Instead, you have treated them with great kindness, as if they were your own children, yet they still rebelled. These people have the hearts of beasts and cannot be treated with human principles. I, having received deep grace, request permission to exterminate them for Your Majesty.

— Zizhi Tongjian, vol. 197

By the end of 644, the Eastern Turks, who were not whole-heartedly supportive of Qilibi Khan in the first place, collapsed in light of the Xueyantuo threat, fleeing back to Tang territory, and were again settled there. They crossed the Yellow River to south, seeking to be settled among Sheng (勝州, in modern Hohhot, but south of the Yellow River) and Xia (夏州, roughly modern Yulin, Shaanxi) Prefectures. Despite officials' opposition, Taizong agreed to settle them. Qilibi, with his reconstituted state in shambles, also returned to China, and was again made a Tang general, ending Tang's attempt to recreate the Eastern Turks as a vassal.

When Zhenzhu subsequently sent an emissary to offer tribute to Taizong, who was at that time deeply into preparation to attack Goguryeo, Taizong responded, "Go back and tell your khan: My son and I are now about to attack Goguryeo. If he thinks that he can take advantage of this, he is welcome to come!" Zhenzhu, fearful of Taizong's anger, sent another emissary to apologize and offering to assist in the military campaign against Goguryeo, an offer that Taizong declined. In 645, after Taizong had defeated the main Goguryeo forces at Mount Zhubi (駐驆山), near the fortress of Anshi (安市, in modern Anshan, Liaoning), Goguryeo's mangniji (regent) Yŏn Kaesomun requested that Zhenzhu to attack the Tang, offering great tributes to him if he did. Zhenzhu, fearful of the Tang response, did not do so.

== Death and succession ==
Zhenzhu died on October 21, 645. Despite the friction that had developed in his latter years, Emperor Taizong held a grand mourning ceremony for Zhenzhu. It was said that Zhenzhu, with Tang permission, had previously made his oldest son by a concubine, Yemang a tolis shad, a title traditionally given to subrulers of the eastern wing, to govern over various tribes, and his wife's son Bazhuo Si Yabgu Khan, giving him the western parts, to govern over the Xueyantuo people, and that Taizong had carried out the creation in grand ceremonies. Yemang was said to be violent and disturbed, and also having a poor relationship with Bazhuo. After Yi'nan's death, both attended the funeral, and after the funeral, Yemang, fearful that Bazhuo would harm him, departed suddenly first, which led Bazhuo to chase him down and kill. Bazhuo thereafter took the throne with the title of Jialijulixueshaduomi Khan (or Duomi Khan, in short).

== Notes ==
1. Chinese: 藥羅葛菩薩; pinyin: Yàoluógé Púsà was a Chinese rendering of the Turkic name Old Turkic: 𐰖𐰍𐰞𐰴𐰺 𐰯𐰆𐰽𐰺, romanized: Yaɣlaqar Pusar, itself a version of Bodhisattva.
2. It is not clear whether Jialibi was the same person as Yemang. However, when describing the dispute between Bazhuo and Yemang in 645, the Tang Huiyao mentioned that at one point, at Zhenzhu's request, Emperor Taizong had created both Bazhuo and Yemang subordinate khan titles, which may suggest that Yemang and Jialibi were the same person. The division described here (by south and north) was different than the west/east and ethnic division described for the division between Bazhuo and Yemang.
3. Dadu was described to be his oldest son, but Yemang was also later described to be his oldest son. Moreover, Dadu's soldiers, described to be from the various tribes, also appeared to coincide with the ethnic composition of the people under Yemang in 645, and so it was possible, but not confirmed, that Dadu and Yemang were the same person.

== Sources ==
- Yuan, Hong (2022). From the Khitans to the Jurchens & Mongols: A History of Barbarians in Triangle Wars & Quartet Conflicts. iUniverse. ISBN 9781663242587.
- Hung, Hing Ming (2013). Li Shi Min, Founding the Tang Dynasty: The Strategies that Made China the Greatest Empire in Asia. Algora Publishing. ISBN 978-0-87586-980-3.

== Primary sources ==
- Tang Huiyao, vol. 96.
- Zizhi Tongjian, vols. 192, 193, 194, 195, 196, 197, 198.

Regnal titles
Preceded by Yiedie Khan (Yishibo)	Khan of Xueyantuo; 628–645	Succeeded by Duomi Khan (Bazhuo)
