= Tang Huiyao =

The Tang Huiyao (simplified Chinese: 唐会要; traditional Chinese: 唐會要; pinyin: Táng Huìyāo; Wade–Giles: T'ang Huiyao; lit. 'Institutional History of Tang') is an institutional history of the Tang dynasty compiled by Wang Pu and presented to Emperor Taizu of Song in 961. The book contains 100 volumes and 514 sections; it has an abundant content for the period before 846, and scarce material unobtainable from the Tongdian, Old Book of Tang, and New Book of Tang.

It combines the earlier Huiyao compiled by Su Mian, which covers the history of Tang to 779, and the Xu Huiyao by Yang Shaofu and others, which extended the coverage to 846. The compilation was finished by the early Song dynasty, with the addition of small amount of material after the reign of Emperor Xuānzong of Tang included by Wang Pu.
