= Göktürk family tree =

Ashina clan of the Turkic Khaganate

The Göktürk family tree refers to the ruling Ashina clan of the Turkic Khaganate, a vast medieval empire which stretched from northeast China to the Black Sea. The following family tree is given in five sections:

1. The united empire up to 603 (death of Khagan Tardu)
2. The west half of the empire which was ruled by yabgus on behalf of the central khagans up to 599 and the same half ruled independently after the empire was partitioned.
3. East half of the empire after 603
4. The reestablishment of the empire after 681 (Second Turkic Khaganate)
5. Western and eastern parts of the first empire

The color legend is as follows.

Khagan (Emperor)	Ruler of the east side	Ruler of the west side	Legendary ancestor

Both the central empire and later the east wing were ruled by the descendants of Bumin and the west part was ruled by the descendants of Istämi with two exceptions;

- Tardu, a yabgu of the west became the central khagan between 599 and 603.
- Yukuk, a shad (a prince) in the east wing became the ruler of the west wing.

In the following trees only those with reigning dates became khagan or yabgu.

== First Turkic Khaganate (before the split) ==
Ashina
Yizhi Nishidu	Other nine children
Neduliu shad
Ashina (semi-legendary)
Axian shad (Ashina Natulu)
(Tuwu of Ashina house)
1. Bumin Qaghan; (551–552)	Istämi (Note: Only as a yabgu.) (551–576)
2.Issik Qaghan (552–554)	3.Muqan Qaghan (554–572)	4.Taspar Qaghan (572–581)	Tardu (Note: 576–599 as the yabgu of the West and 599–603 as the khagan.) (576–603)	Tamgan (Turksanf)
7.Ishbara Qaghan (581–587)	8.Bagha Qaghan (587–589)	5.Apa Qaghan	6.Amrak Khagan (581–581)
9.Tulan Qaghan (589–599)

== Eastern Turkic Khaganate (after 603) ==
Bagha Qaghan (587–589)
E1.Yami Qaghan (603–609)
E2.Shibi Qaghan (611–619)	E3.Ashina Xichun Qaghan (619–621)	E4.Illig Qaghan (621–630)
Ashina Jiesheshuai	Yukuk Shad (638–642)

== Western Turkic Khaganate (after 603) ==
Tardu (576–603)
Yangsu Tegin	Külüg Sibir (630–631)
Niri Qaghan	Shikui Khagan (611–618)	Bagha Shad	Tong Yabghu Qaghan (618–630)
Heshana Qaghan (603–611)	Böri Shad	Duolu Qaghan (633–634)	Ishbara Tolis (634–638)	Sy Yabghu Qaghan (631–633)
(Khazars ?)	Ashina Helu (651–658)	İl Küllig
Irbis Seguy (642–651)

== First Turkic Khaganate (both united and split) ==
Ashina Tuwu
Bumin Qaghan (551–552)	Istämi (551–576)
Issik Qaghan (552–554)	Muqan Qaghan (554–572)	Taspar Qaghan (572–581)	Tardu (599–603)	Tamgan
Ishbara Qaghan (581–587)	Bagha Qaghan (587–589)	Apa Qaghan	Amrak Khagan (581–581)	Yangsu Tegin	Külüg Sibir (630–631)
Tulan Qaghan (589–599)	Tolis Khagan (603–609)	Niri Qaghan	Shekui (611–618)	Bagha Shad	Tong Yabghu Qaghan (618–630)
Shibir Khagan (611–619)	Chulu Khagan (618–621)	Kat Il Khagan (621–630)	Heshana Qaghan (603–611)	Böri Shad	Duolu Qaghan (633–634)	Ishbara Tolis (634–638)	Sy Yabghu Qaghan (631–633)
Ashina Jiesheshuai (Kürşat)	Yukuk Shad (638–642)	El Kulug Shad
Irbis Seguy (642–651)

== Second Turkic Khaganate ==
(Itmis Beg of Ashina House)
Qapaghan Qaghan (694–716)	Ilterish Qaghan (681–694)	Ashina Duoxifu
Inel Qaghan (716–717)	Bilge Qaghan (717–734)	Kul Tigin	Pan Kül Tigin
Yollıg Khagan (734–739)	Tengri Qaghan (739–741)	Özmiş Khagan (742–744)	Kulun Beg (Note: According to Taşağıl he was Özmiş Khagan's son.)
