= Duolu Qaghan =

Qaghan of the Western Turkic Khaganate
- Reign: 633–634 (or 632–634)
- Predecessor: Sy Yabghu Qaghan
- Successor: Ishbara Tolis Qaghan
- Died: 634
Names
- Ashina Nishu (阿史那泥孰)
Regnal name
- Tun'aloubaxilibi Duolu Qaghan (吞阿婁拔奚利邲咄陸可汗)
- House: Ashina
- Dynasty: Western Turkic Khaganate
- Father: Bagha Shad
- Religion: Tengrism

Duolu Qaghan (Chinese: 咄陸可汗), personal name Ashina Nishu (阿史那泥孰), full regnal name Tun'aloubaxilibi Duolu Qaghan (吞阿婁拔奚利邲咄陸可汗), was a ruler of the Western Turkic Khaganate. He was the first Western Turkic qaghan to be appointed by the Tang dynasty.

== Early life ==
Ashina Nishu was Bagha Shad's son. After his uncle Tong Yabghu Qaghan was killed by Külüg Sibir, the candidate of the eastern or Duolu faction (the other being the western Nushibi faction) the Duolu tribes became the dominant power of the Western Turkic Khaganate. Nishu (later Duolu Qaghan), then a partisan of rival Nushibi clan supported his cousin (Tong Yabghu's son) Dieli Teqin to throne in 631 as Sy Yabghu Qaghan. In 633 after a coup, Sy Yabghu escaped to south and the Nushibi clan supported Nishu who was a living in Karasahr (now a city in Xinjiang Uighur Autonomous Region of China) to throne as Duolu Qaghan.

According to the Turkish historian DAydın Usta, who relies on the medieval Persian historian Al-Taberi, Ibn al-Athir and Belazuri, Duolu tried to help Khusrow III against the armies of the Arabic caliphate and participated in minor battles, but he had to return east because of a rebellion.

== Reign ==
Beginning with his reign, the Nushibi clan became the dominant power in the khaganate. In 634 after a year of rule he died and left his throne to his brother Tong Shad (later Ishbara Tolis).

Duolu Qaghan Ashina Clan
Preceded by Sy Yabghu Qaghan	Khagan of the Western Turkic Khaganate; 633–634	Succeeded by Ishbara Tolis
