= Shad (prince) =

Shad (Old Turkic: 𐱁𐰑, romanized: šad) was a state office in the early Central and East Asian Turkic states, roughly equivalent to governor. "Shad" could only be an appointee over a vassal tribe, where he represented interests of the preeminent Kagan. The name of this tribe was included in his title. For example, Tardu-shad could only be a Shad over Tardu tribe. The title carried autonomy in different degrees, and its links with the central authority of kagan varied from economical and political subordination to superficial political deference. The title Shad is borrowed from an Iranian source (cf. Sogdian ’ġšyδ, Saka šao, Middle Iranian šāδ, Persian šāh < Old Persian 𐏋 xšāyaθiya ‘king’, or Avestan xšaēta "chief").

The position of Shad was traditionally given to the member of a ruling (Ashina) clan. Frequently, Shad was a blood prince, a representative of the next generation. Mahmud Kashgari defined the title Shad as an heir apparent a step above Yabgu. In the early Turkic Turgesh Kaganate, Shad was a ruler of the east wing, and Yabgu was a ruler of the west wing of the state, both directly subordinated to the Kagan. According to Movses Kagankatvatsi, Böri Shad was a 7th-century Western Turkic Khaganate prince and an ishad, or a ruler of a principality, a nephew of Tong Yabgu Kagan, and a son of Moho shad, who may have been a Yabgu of the Khazars. Later, after a split of Western Turkic Kaganate, the splinter western part was headed by Yukuk Shad of the royal Ashina clan, who became a Kagan of the "western surnames", with a throne name Yipi Duolu Kehan (*Yelbi-Turuk-Kagan).

With weakening of centralized states, the Shads were gaining more sovereignty, and historical accounts record independent states with "Shad" as a supreme ruler. The title "Shad" left prominent marks in the Asian toponymy, and on many mints of Middle Asia Late Antique and Early Middle Age coins, like Shad Bagh in northern Lahore in Punjab, Pakistan, and early Bukhara, Uzbekistan coins.

When the last Eastern Turkic Kagan Illig suffered a defeat from the Tang empire in 630 CE, the Chinese annals recorded that only after the last royal prince, a certain Yshbara-Shad Sunishi (沙缽略設蘇尼失) and Ilig's uncle, surrendered, did the Eastern Türkic Kaganate cease to exist. Gumilyov explained the Shad's full title as "mighty prince of [the tribe] Shunishi" (Note: Shunishi 鼠泥施 is a Western Turkic Duolu tribe. 蘇尼 Suni is the Chinese transcription of an Eastern Turkic tribal name So-ni mentioned in an 8th century Old Tibetan document. Atwood (2013) reconstructed the Old Turkic underlying form of element 蘇尼 Suni as *Soni or *Süŋi and 鼠泥施 Shunishi as *Šüŋiš, both of which he related to the personal name 鼠匿 Shuni < *Šünrik; Atwood derived all from *süŋiš ~ süŋüš, from root *süŋü, with a variant šüŋi. "soldier, war".)

== See also ==
- History of Kazakhstan
- History of Uzbekistan
