= Perso-Turkic war of 627–629 =

7th century war in Transcaucasia

- Part of Göktürk–Persian wars and the Byzantine–Sasanian War of 602–628
Date	627–629
Location	Transcaucasia
Result	Turkic-Byzantine victory

Belligerents
Sasanian Empire; Sasanian Iberia	Western Turkic Khaganate; Byzantine Empire

Commanders and leaders
Khosrow II; Shahraplakan; Shahrbaraz; Stephen I of Iberia (executed)	Tong Yabghu Qaghan; Böri Shad; Chorpan Tarkhan; Heraclius

The Perso-Turkic war of 627–629 was the final conflict between the Sasanian Empire and the Western Turkic Khaganate. Unlike the previous two wars, it was not fought in Central Asia, but in Transcaucasia. Hostilities were initiated in 627 by Tong Yabghu Qaghan of the Western Göktürks and Emperor Heraclius of the Byzantine Empire. Opposing them were the Sassanid Persians, allied with the Avars.

== Background ==
Following the 626 siege of Constantinople by the Avars and Sassanids, the beleaguered Byzantine Emperor Heraclius found himself politically isolated. He could not rely on the Christian Armenian potentates of Transcaucasia, since they were branded as heretics by the Orthodox Church, and even the King of Iberia preferred to befriend the religiously tolerant Persians. Against this dismal background, he found a natural ally in Tong Yabghu Qaghan of the Western Turkic Khaganate. Earlier in 568, the Turks under Istämi had turned to the Byzantines when their relations with Persia soured over commerce issues. Istämi sent an embassy led by the Sogdian diplomat Maniah directly to Constantinople, which arrived in 568 and offered not only silk as a gift to Justin II, but also proposed an alliance against Sassanid Persia. Justin II agreed and sent an embassy to the Turkic Khaganate, ensuring the direct Chinese silk trade desired by the Sogdians.

In 625, Heraclius dispatched an emissary named Andrew to the steppes, who promised the Khagan some "staggering riches" in return for military aid. The Khagan, on his part, was anxious to secure the Chinese-Byzantine trade along the Silk Road, which had been disrupted by the Persians in the aftermath of the 600–610 raids into the Sasanid Empire. He sent word to the Emperor that "I shall take revenge on your enemies and will come with my valiant troops to your help". A unit of 1,000 horsemen fought their way through Persian Transcaucasia and delivered the Khagan's message to the Byzantine camp in Anatolia.

== Siege of Derbent ==
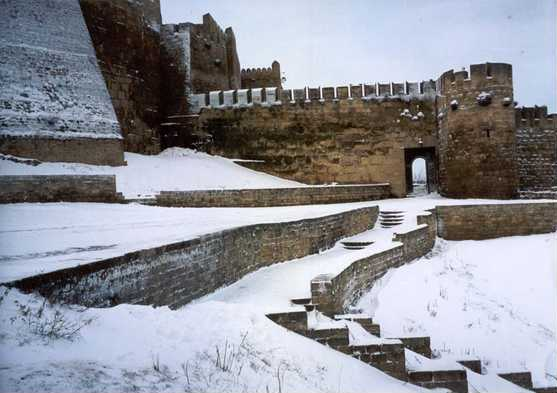
Sassanian fortress in Derbent.

Early in 627, the Göktürks and their Khazars allies approached the Caspian Gates at Derbent. This newly built stronghold was the only gate to the fertile land of Aghvania (modern-day Azerbaijan). Lev Gumilev observes that the lightly armed militia of Aghvania was no match against the hordes of heavy cavalry led by Tong Yabghu. His troops stormed Derbent and swarmed over Aghvania, plundering it thoroughly. The fall and sack of Derbent were described in detail by the Armenian historian Movses Kagankatvatsi, thought to have been an eyewitness to the event:

At the arrival of the all-powerful scourge (universal wrath) confronting us, the invaders Turks, like billowing waves of the sea, crashed against the walls and demolished them to their foundations. [In Partaw], seeing the terrible danger from the multitude of hideously ugly, vile, broad-faced, without eyelashes, and with long flowing hair like women, which descended upon them, a great terror (trembling) seized the inhabitants. They were even more horrified when they saw the accurate and strong Khazar archers, whose arrows rained down upon them like heavy hailstones, and how they Khazars, like ravenous wolves that had lost all shame, fell upon them and mercilessly slaughtered them on the streets and squares of the city. Their eyes had no mercy for neither the beautiful, nor handsome, nor the young men or women; they did not spare even the unfit, harmless, lame, nor old; they had no pity (compassion, regrets), and their hearts did not shrink at the sight of the babies embracing their murdered mothers; to the contrary, they suckled blood from their breasts like milk.

The fall of the fortress that had been considered impregnable sparked panic across the country. Aghvanian forces withdrew to their capital, Partav, from whence they made for the Caucasus Mountains. The Göktürks and Khazars overtook them near the village of Kalankatuyk, where they were either killed or taken prisoner. The conquerors imposed upon Aghvania a heavy system of taxation, as reported by Movses:

The Lord of the North wreaked havoc all over the country. He sent his wardens to deal with artisans of all kind, especially those skilled in washing out gold, extraction of silver and iron, as well as making copper items. He imposed duties on fishers and goods from the great Kura and Aras rivers, in addition to the didrachma traditionally levied by the Persian authorities.

== Siege of Tbilisi ==
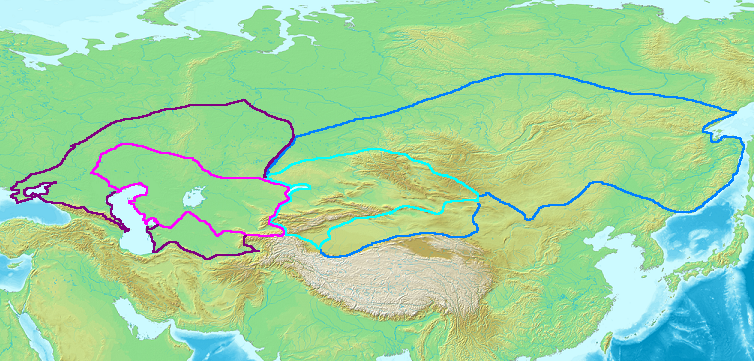
Gokturk khaganates at their height, c. 600 AD: Western Gokturk: Lighter area is direct rule, darker areas show sphere of influence. Eastern Gokturk: Lighter area is direct rule, darker areas show sphere of influence.

The next objective of the Turkic–Byzantine offensive was the Kingdom of Iberia, whose ruler Stephanus was a tributary to Khosrow II. In the words of Movses Kagankatvatsi, the Khazars "encircled and besieged the famous and great sybaritic trade city of Tbilisi," whereupon they were joined by Emperor Heraclius with his mighty army.

Heraclius and Tong Yabghu (called Ziebel in the Byzantine sources) met under the walls of Narikala. The Tong Yabghu rode up to Heraclius, kissed his shoulder and made a bow. In return, Heraclius hugged Tong Yabghu, called him his son, and crowned him with his own diadem. During the ensuing feast the Khazar leaders received ample gifts in the form of earrings and clothes, while Tong Yabghu was promised the hand of the Emperor's daughter, Eudoxia Epiphania.

The siege dragged on without much progress, punctuated by frequent sallies on the part of the besieged; one of these claimed the life of their king. After two months the Khazars retreated to the steppe, promising to return by autumn. Tong Yabghu left young Böri Shad, either his son or nephew, in charge of the remaining forty thousand which were to assist Heraclius during the siege. Before long these departed as well, leaving the Byzantines to continue the siege alone and prompting jeers from the besieged.

When the Georgians ironically referred to the Emperor as "the goat", hinting at his incestuous marriage, Heraclius recalled a passage from the Book of Daniel about the two-horned ram overthrown by the one-horned goat. He interpreted this as a good sign and struck southward against Persia. On 12 December 627 he appeared on the bank of the Tigris and clashed with Persian forces near the ruins of Nineveh. In January he ravaged the environs of the Persian capital Ctesiphon, signaling a change in the Persian-Byzantine relations.

== Conclusion ==
After the triumph of Heraclius, Tong Yabghu hastened to resume the siege of Tbilisi and successfully stormed the city in winter. "With their swords raised, they advanced on the walls, and all this multitude, climbing upon each other's shoulders, rose up the walls. A black shadow fell upon the wobegone citizens; they were vanquished and lost their ground," Movses narrates. Although the Georgians surrendered without further resistance, the city was looted and its citizens were massacred. The Persian governor and the Georgian prince were tortured to death in the presence of Tong Yabghu.

The Göktürks, renowned for their expertise in hand-to-hand combat, never excelled in siegecraft. For this reason Gumilev attributes the taking of Tbilisi to the Khazars. There are good reasons for believing that this success encouraged Tong Yabghu to grander designs. This time he planned to incorporate Aghvania into his khaganate, rather than to wield a usual campaign of plunder. Before returning to Suyab he instructed Böri Shad and his generals to "spare the lives of the rulers and nobles of that land, in as much as they come out to meet my son, surrender to my rule, concede their towns, castles, and trade to my troops". This indicates that Tong Yabghu was eager to retain control of the westernmost portion of the Silk Road, as he tightened his grip of its other segments all the way east to China. In April 630, Böri Shad, determined to expand his control of Transcaucasia, sent his general Chorpan Tarkhan with as few as 3,000 cavalry to invade Armenia. Using a characteristic ploy of nomadic warriors, Chorpan Tarkhan ambushed and annihilated a Persian force of 10,000 dispatched by Shahrbaraz to counter the invasion.

== See also ==
- Byzantine–Sasanian War of 602–628
- Perso-Turkic war of 588–589
- Timeline of the Turkic peoples (500–1300)
