= Chuluo Khagan =

Chuluo Khagan or Chuluo Qaghan may refer to:

- Heshana Khagan (died 619), personal name Ashina Daman, also known as Chuluo Khagan, a khagan of Western Turkic Khaganate
- Ashina Xichun (died 620), a khagan of Eastern Turkic Khaganate
