= Külüg Sibir =

Baghatur Külüg Sibir Qaghan

Qaghan of the Western Turkic Khaganate
- Reign: 628–630
- Predecessor: Tong Yabghu Qaghan
- Successor: Sy Yabghu Qaghan
- Died: 630; Altai Mountains
Names
- Unknown
Regnal name
- Baghatur Külüg Sibir Qaghan (莫賀咄侯屈利俟毗可汗)
- House: Ashina
- Dynasty: Western Turkic Khaganate
- Father: Tardu Qaghan
- Religion: Tengrism; Eastern Christianity (if Organa)

Baghatur Külüg Sibir Qaghan (Chinese: 莫賀咄侯屈利俟毗可汗), personal name unknown, was a ruler of the Western Turkic Khaganate in the 7th century. He was probably Tardu Qaghan's son and the governor of the northern provinces of the khaganate during the reigns of his nephews. He is commonly known simply as Külüg Sibir or Baghatur Qaghan.

== Background ==
The Western Turkic Khaganate in present-day Turkestan was founded as the result of the partition of the First Turkic Khaganate after the death of Tardu in 603. It was also called On Ok ("Ten arrows") referring to ten powerful tribes in the empire. Five tribes (so-called Duolu) to the northeast and five tribes to the southwest (so-called Nushibi) formed two rival factions, the border line being Ili River.

== Revolt ==
In 630, the Duolu clan of tribes together with the Karluks revolted against Tong Yabghu Qaghan. Tong Yabghu was supported by the Nushibi faction. Külüg Sibir murdered Tong Yabghu (who was his nephew) and declared himself as khagan with the support of the Duolu clan. According to S. G. Klyashtorny and T. I. Sultanov, he was trying to end the tension between the Khagan and the vassal tribes. However the Nushibi faction didn't accept his title and supported Tong Yabghu's son to throne. Although Külüg Sibir asked for Duolu support, next year he had to abdicate. He escaped to the Altai Mountains where he was killed by Nushibi partisans.

== See also ==
- Göktürk family tree
- Organa

Külüg Sibir Ashina Clan
Preceded by Tong Yabghu Qaghan	Khagan of the Western Turkic Khaganate; 628–630	Succeeded by Sy Yabghu Qaghan
