= Shikui Khagan =

Turkic ruler in the 7th century

Shikui Kaghan

Qaghan of the Western Turkic Khaganate
- Reign: 611–618
- Predecessor: Heshana Khagan
- Successor: Tong Yabghu Khagan
- Died: 618; Suyab
- House: Ashina
- Father: Tulu Tegin (都六)
- Religion: Tengrism

Shikui Khagan, also Zik Khagan (r. 611–619 or possibly 610–617; Chinese: 射匱可汗; Middle Chinese: *ʑia-gwi; Middle Persian Zyk, Žeg) was the third khagan of the Western Turkic Khaganate. He was the grandson of Tardu (575–603) through his son Tulu (都六).

== Background ==
The Western Turkic Khaganate in present-day Turkestan was founded as the result of the partition of the First Turkic Khaganate after the death of Tardu in 603. It was also called On Ok ("Ten arrows") referring to ten powerful tribes in the khaganate. Five tribes (called Duolu) to the northeast and five tribes to the southwest (called Nushibi) formed the two rival factions, the border line being the Ili River.

== After partitioning ==
Shikui Khagan was Tardu's grandson and governor of Chach (Tashkent) He was expected to be enthroned after the death of Tardu. But the Dulu faction enthroned Ashina Daman (later known as Heshana Qaghan) who was a generation younger than Shekui. But Daman was a very inexperienced ruler and was a puppet of the Dulu clan. The Nushibi clan as well as Silk Road merchants who suffered from the increasing anarchy supported Shikuito throne in 611. When Daman affiliated partisans arrested a Chinese ambassador to Shekui, Shikuirevolted and Daman had to flee to Sui China where he was killed.

Shikuimaintained order in the khaganate and provided security on the Silk Road. His reign marks the beginning of Nushibi supremacy. In 618, he was succeeded by his brother Tong during whose reign Western Turkic Khaganate reached to apogee.

== Coinage ==
Shikui Khagan (as "Zik Khagan") is known from numismatics, especially a silver medallion issued in 616–617 in Isfahan after his victory over the Sasanids and the Hephthalites. His campaign led him deep into Iran, in the areas of Ray and Isfahan. The obverse of the coin portrays the ruler and bears the Pahlavi inscriptions GDH 'pzwn zyk ("the Victory, increase, Zik"), and MLK"n MLK' ("king of kings"). The reverse displays an altar with fire, with attendants left and right. The iconography of the portrait is similar to that of the coinage of the Western Turk ruler Tong Yabghu Qaghan.

A seal is also known in his name, for the administration of the conquered territory. It is kept in the private collection of Forughi in Iran. It contains a Middle Persian inscription reading zyk hhn GDH ("Zik Khagan, victory") and a runic inscription b(a)q(e)šeb qiy(ū)g(0)ŋkӣ ("Take care of your companions, home, village, gain a good name for yourself").

The coinage of Zik is considered as highly similar to that of the early Samanid ruler Mansur I, suggesting some kind of continuity.

Shikui Khagan Ashina Clan
Preceded by Heshana Khagan	Khagan of the Western Turkic Khaganate; 611–618	Succeeded by Tong Yabghu Khagan
