= Böri Shad =

- Prince of the Western Turkic Khaganate
- House: Ashina
- Father: Bagha Shad
- Religion: Tengrism

Böri Shad (fl. c. 627; Old Turkic: 𐰋𐰇𐰼𐰃𐱁𐰑, böri šad; Chinese: 步利設; pinyin: Bùlì Shè; "Wolf governor") was a prince and general of the Western Turkic Khaganate. He was the son of Bagha Shad and a nephew of Tong Yabghu Qaghan. He fought the Persians south of the Caucasus during the Perso-Turkic war of 627–629. In this war the Western Turkic Khaganate was allied with the Byzantine Empire against Persia during the Byzantine–Sasanian War of 602–628.

== Biography ==
Böri Shad was an appointed head of a provincial principality in the far western North Caucasus periphery of the Western Turkic Khaganate. A succession of princes, or shads, occupied that position. The principality of Böri Shad originated in 558, when Kara-Churin (later named Tardu), a brother of the ruling khagan, campaigned in Ural and Volga regions, but the lands he captured were given to his younger brother Tamgan and his cousin Buri-khan. From 576 through 583, Tardu fought with the Byzantine Empire, but, instead of himself, he appointed as head of the campaign his cousin Böri Shad, whose possessions were in the North Caucasus.

According to Movses Kagankatvatsi, Böri Shad was a 7th-century Göktürk prince and an ishad or general in the army of the Western Turkic Khaganate. He was the son of Bagha Shad, who may have been the yabgu or prince of the Khazars. (anachronistic since the Khazars were not yet a separate polity.) Böri Shad's uncle was Tong Yabghu Khagan, the khagan of the Western Göktürks.

Böri Shad was probably commander of the Khazar forces during the Perso-Turkic war of 627–629, which was fought in the Caucasus. Under Böri Shad's command the Khazars sacked many cities in Caucasian Albania and attempted to establish a firm foothold in the South Caucasus.

Following Tong Yabghu Qaghan's instructions, Böri Shad suggested to the Persian satrap of Aghvania and to Catholicos Viro that they should acknowledge the Khagan as their overlord. The Satrap refused to pay homage to the Turks and fled to Persia. Viro was also hesitant.

After the Turks started to plunder the cities, Viro escaped to the mountainous region of Artsakh, where the Turks managed to track him down. When asked to capitulate, Viro summoned princes and potentates from across the country and asked them whether the Albanians should resist the invaders. It was decided that resistance was futile.

Viro personally brought the message of obedience and allegiance to Böri Shad, whose army was encamped in the vicinity of Partav. He reproached Viro for his delays: "Why did you procrastinate with your visit? If only you were more expeditious, your country would have been spared the calamities brought about by my troops".

After paying homage to Böri Shad, Viro asked him to free the Albanian prisoners. Böri Shad dispatched his bailiffs to search the tents. They found many young men hiding among the treasure and cattle and set them free.

In April 630 Böri Shad took advantage of dynastic disorders in the Sassanid Empire and dispatched Chorpan Tarkhan to conquer Armenia. Although the campaign was successful, Böri Shad had to flee to Central Asia after learning about the murder of Tong Yabghu later that year.

The 17th century Volga Bulgar compilation Ja'far Tarikh (a work of disputed authenticity) represents Börishad being elected as the second Khagan of the Khazars after Tong Yabghu's death, defeating Bulan-shad and Alp-shad (i.e Alp Ilutuer), sons of Tong Yabghu. Alp then founded Kingdom of North Caucasia Huns, though he submitted to Börishad shortly after, who was succeeded by his son Irbis.
