= Bagha Shad =

- Prince of the Western Turkic Khaganate
- Issue: Böri Shad
- House: Ashina
- Father: Yangsu Tegin
- Religion: Tengrism

Bagha Shad (Old Turkic: 𐰉𐰍𐰀𐱁𐰑, baγa šad; Chinese: 莫賀設; pinyin: Mòhè Shè) was a Göktürk shad or general of the early 7th century. He was a close kinsman and subject of Tong Yabghu Qaghan. Bagha Shad was probably the father of Böri Shad and may have been the yabghu or prince of the Khazars.

He is referred to in Chinese sources as having sojourned in the Tang dynasty in 618–626, possibly as Tong Yabghu Qaghan's emissary to the Emperor Gaozu of Tang. Thereafter he disappears from the historical record.
