= Nushibi =

Former tribal confederacy in Kazakhstan in Chinese sources

Nushibi
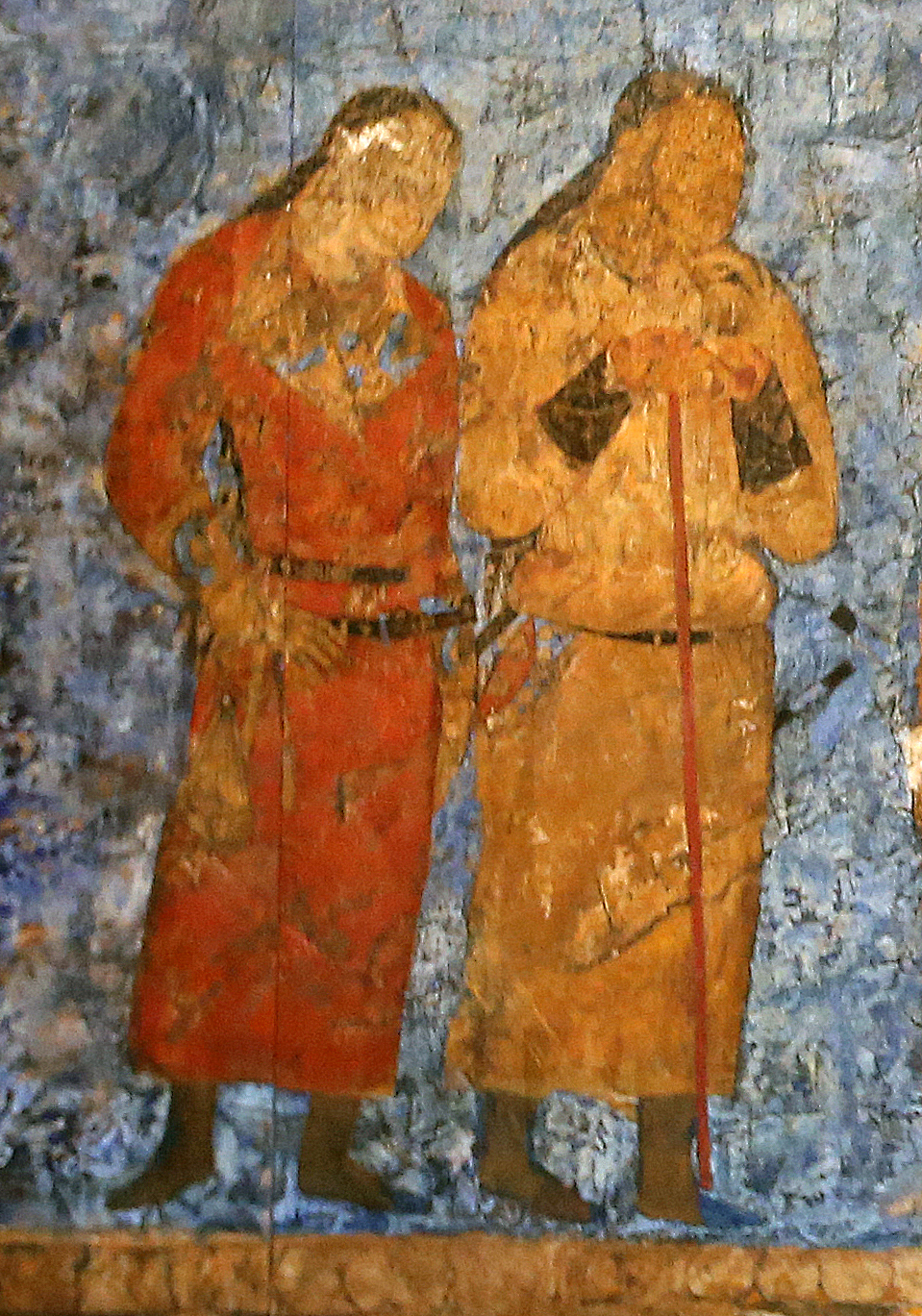
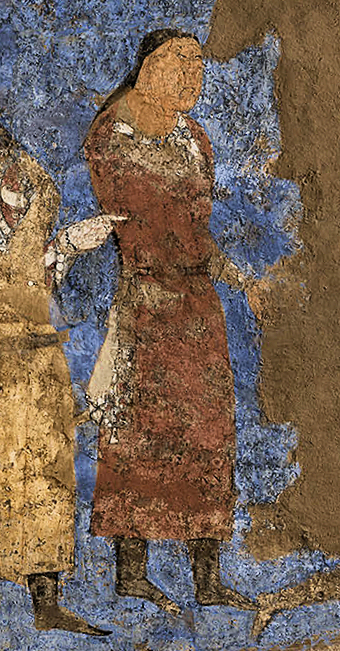
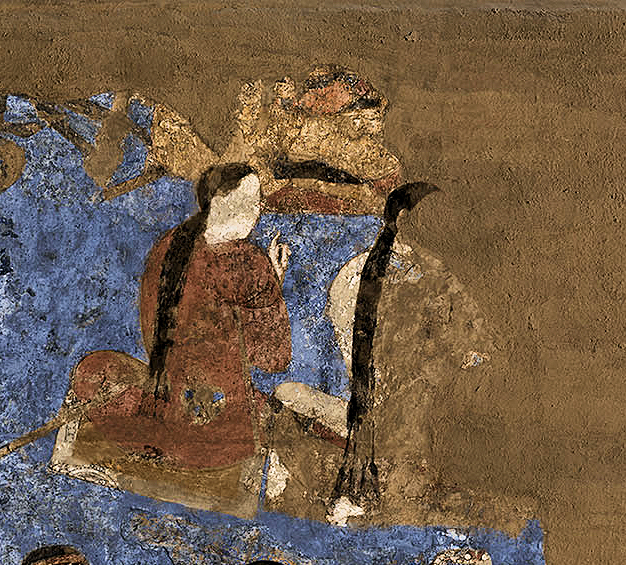
Western Turk Nushibi officers and seated courtiers, Afrasiab paintings, 648–651

Nushibi (Nu-shibi, Chinese: 弩失畢; pinyin: Nǔ shībì; Middle Chinese: *nuo^{X}ɕiɪt̚piɪt̚) was a Chinese collective name for five tribes of the right (western) wing in the Western Turkic Khaganate, and members of the "ten arrows" confederation found in Chinese literature (十箭 shíjiàn; Old Turkic: 𐰆𐰣:𐰸, romanized: On Oq). The references to Nushibi appeared in Chinese sources in 651 and disappeared after 766. The Nushibi tribes occupied the lands of the Western Turkic Khaganate west of the Ili River of modern Kazakhstan.

== Etymology ==
Yury Zuev reconstructs Nushibi's Middle Chinese pronunciation as nou siet-piet, which, he asserts, transcribes Turkic oŋ šadapït "right wing". Šadapït either means "entourage of the Shad" (Clauson, 1972) or is a title, either cognate with Old Persian *satapati (Bombaci, 1976) "lord of a hundred" or borrowed from Middle Iranian *špādapit < *špād-pad "army lord", compare Pahlavi Spāhbed (Róna-Tas, 2016:70). If true, Nushibi might be identified with the Šadapït (Old Turkic: 𐱁𐰑𐰯𐰃𐱃) mentioned in the Orkhon inscriptions.

Other scholars etymologised Nushibi without Šadapït in mind. János Harmatta reconstructed "Nushibi" as *nu śipiɺ, *nu śipir; and proposed Iranian etymologies, meaning "good horsemen": with *nu "good" (cf. Old Persian *naiba-) and *aśśaβâra, *aśva-bâra, or *aśśaβârya (cf. Saka aśśa "horse", Old Indic bhârya, "soldier, servant"). Nurlan Kenzheakhmet etymologised 弩失畢 (MC: nuǝ-șit-pjit) as Chinese transcription of Sogdian nšypyk (*nišēbīg), nšmy (*nišame), meaning "west".

== Ethnic and sartorial characteristics ==
In the Afrasiab murals, the Nushibi Western Turks are ethnic Turks, rather than Turkicized Sogdians, as suggested by the marked Mongoloid features and faces without full beards. They are the most numerous ethnic group in the mural, and are not ambassadors, but rather military attendants. Their depiction offers a unique glimpse into the costumes of the Turks in the 6–7th century. They typically wear 3 or 5 long plaits, often gathered together into a single long one. They have ankle-long monochromic sleeved coats with two lapels. This fashion for the collar is first seen in Khotan, a traditional Turkic land, in the 2nd–4th century. They have low black sharp-nosed boots. They wear gold bracelets with lapis lazuli or pearls.

== Historical outline ==
=== Western Turkic Kaganate ===
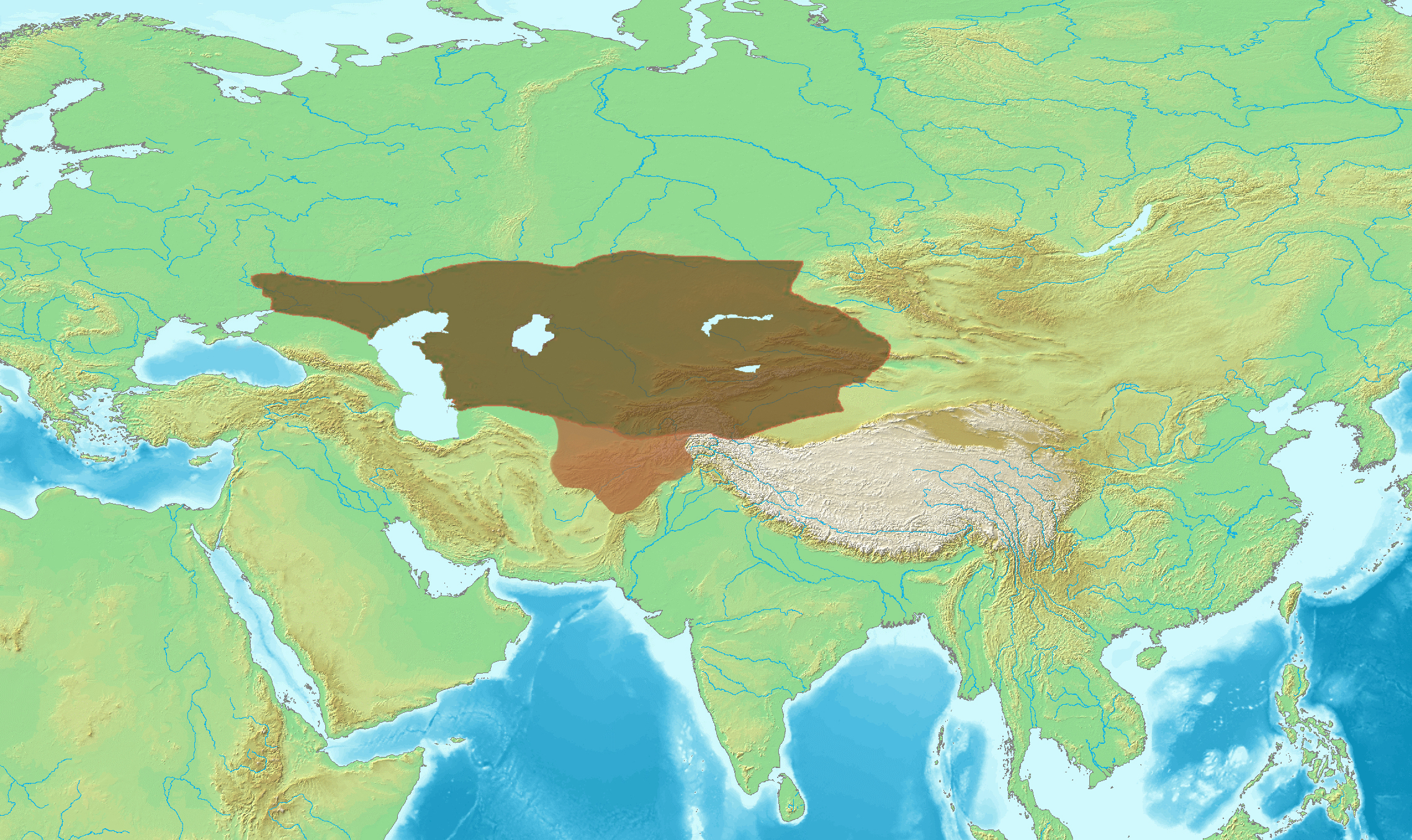
Greatest extent of the Western Turkic Khaganate after the Battle of Bukhara

After the split of the First Turkic Khaganate in 604, the Western Turkic Khaganate initially had a three-tribe Nushibi right wing and a five-tribe Duolu left wing. Later on, two Nushibi tribes, Äskäl and Qoshu, reorganized themselves, each subdivided into two tribes, bringing the total numbers to ten, thus the collective name On Oq (Ch. 十箭 "ten arrows"). Both the Nushibi and Duolu belonged to the Turkic tribes of the Chuy group, and spoke close dialects.

The transfer of supremacy from the Duolu group to Nushibi had consequences across Eurasian continent. The Nushibi controlled, and benefited, from the operation of their section of the transcontinental trade road (Silk Road), and were in alliance with Sogdiana, a chain of small oasis principalities who were also members of the Western Turkic Khaganate, and served as main operators of the Silk Road. Nushibi interest in the Silk Road operation brought them, in addition to the Sogdians, into a coalition with the Byzantine Empire and China, two other superpowers interested in the east-west trade. In the west, the coalition included the Khazars in the North Caucasus, and the Bulgars in the north Pontic steppes. This alignment was opposed by a coalition of two other powers, Persia and the Eastern Turkic Khaganate, which brought about the first world wars of the 7th century Early Middle Ages.

Nushibi interests in the Western Turkic Khaganate were advanced by Tong Yabghu Qaghan, known from the Armenian annals as "King of the North". The capital was located north of Chach (modern Tashkent) oasis. The period of Nushibi dominance was interrupted in 628 by a joined revolt of Karluk and Duolu tribes, and the death of Tong Yabghu Qaghan at the hands of his uncle. In the interregnum, led by his uncle Külüg Sibir with the title Baghatur Qaghan, the Duolu fraction restored its former dominant position. The coup brought a considerable upshot, in 630 Baghatur Qaghan granted the Bulgars their independence and allow them to reorganize into what became known as Great Bulgaria. Nushibi opposition to the usurper was headed by Ashina Nishu, a ruler with a seat in Paykend (Paikent), who ruled Bukhara province. Külüg Sibir was killed in 631, and Nushibi installed their choice, a son of Tong Yabghu Qaghan, Sy Yabghu Qaghan. They soon had to replace him with Ashina Nishu under the name Duolu Qaghan (632–634), probably to appease the northern Duolu tribes. The next succession followed the traditional lateral succession order, a younger brother of Nishu was enthroned with a title Ishbara Tolis (634–639), he enacted a major reform by consenting to the Duolu and Nushibi wings' autonomy and native leadership, not drawn from the Ashina clan. The order, favorable to the Duolu and Nushibi, was harmful to the Karluks, Yagma, Kipchaks, Basmals, and worst of all to the descendants of the Eastern/Northern Xiongnu – Chuyüe (later Shatuo) and Chumi who were especially anguished because their Chumuhun and Chuban kins were in the privileged positions both in Duolu and Nushibi wings.

=== Independence ===
In 647 the Western Turkic Khaganate was split into two independent states as a result of Ili River treaty. The independence period lasted until the rise of the Second Turkic Khaganate. In 667 the Nushibi wing of the On oq allied with Tibet. At around 720, a campaign led by Kul Tegin defeated the forces of the Nushibi tribal union led by the Ezgil (Izgil) tribe, and subjugated the former "western wing", which from that time disappeared from the literature. The episode of the military campaign is mentioned in the Bilge Kagan inscription in the Orkhon inscriptions.

=== Nushibi tribal leaders ===
Tongdian, Vol. 199 records the five sub-tribes' names and titles of their leaders.

Hanzi	Pinyin	Beckwith's reconstruction	Zuev's reconstruction
阿悉結闕俟斤	Āxījiē què sìjīn	*Äskäl (Note: or *Ärski) čur irkin	*Ezgil Kül-erkin
哥舒闕俟斤	Gēshū què sìjīn	*Qošu (Note: possibly reflects Turkic küšü "snout" or kušču "fowler, falconeer") čur irkin	*Kašu Kül-erkin
拔塞幹暾沙缽(略)俟斤	Básègàn tūn (Note: 暾 is possibly an allograph of tŭtún 吐屯) shābō(lüè) sìjīn	*Barsqan tun iśbara irkin	*Barsḫan Tun-ašpa-[ra]-erkin
阿悉結泥孰俟斤	Āxījiē níshú sìjīn	*Äskäl niźuk (Note: or *nêšug) irkin	*Ezgil Nizuk-erkin
阿舒處半俟斤	Gēshū chùbàn sìjīn	*Qošu čupan irkin	*Kašu Čopan-erkin

== Ethnic and linguistic affiliation ==
The difference between Nushibi and Duolu groups was solely economical, a consequence of their relative geographical location. Duolu occupied northern portion of the Middle Asia steppes, away from the main artery of the Silk Road, and were little affected by the intracontinental trade. The main source of Duolu trade income came from Turfan of the Turfan basin. Nushibi occupied lands south of Duolu, controlled a major stretch of the caravan road artery and numerous branches, and were profoundly affected by its operation. Bilingual Turkic-Sogdian merchants operated the constellation of oasis city-states with a common name Sogdiana and established a symbiotic relationship with their Nushibi nomadic sponsors. Lev Gumilyov noted that Duolu and Nushibi language was a "djo"-type dialect (djabgu), as opposed to the "yo"-type dialect (yabgu). The "djo"-type dialects belong to the Kipchak and Siberian Turkic branches of the Turkic language family; in Chuvash, the only extant Oghur dialect, "y-" /j/ becomes occasionally "ś-" /ɕ/.

== Orkhon Inscriptions ==
Bilge Khagan inscription, 1st side, 14:

I, Tengri- llike and Tengri born Bilge kagan Turkic. Hear my words. When my father, Bilge kagan Turkic, ruled, you, supreme Turk beks, lower Tarduš beks, Šad – apyt beks led by Kul Čur, the rest Tüles beks, Apa Tarqan…

Bilge Khagan inscription, 1st side, 15:

Led by Shad – Apyt beks, Bairuks... Tamgan Tarqan, Tonyukuk, Boila Bağa Tarqan, Buyruqs..., Inner Buyruqs, led by Sebek Kul Erkin, all Buyruq beks! My father...

Bilge Khagan inscription, 2nd side, 2:

I, Tengri-like and Tengri-born Turkic kagan mounted the throne. Hear my words you all, my younger brothers and my sons, my people and relatives, my nation, šad- apyt beks in the south, tarqan and buyruq beks in the north, Thirty (Tatars?), Beks and the people of Nine Oğuzes! Hear my words and listen! All people after me in the east to sunrise

Kül Tegin inscription, 2nd side, 2:

We fought with [...] against Qošu tutuq. He [Kül Tegin] killed many of their brave men. He brought a lot of their properties and belongings. When Kül Tegin was twenty-seven-year-old, he went to the Qarluq people. They became our enemies. We went on a campaign to the Tamaq-iduq headwaters.

== See also ==
- Yueban
- Chuyue
- Geshu Han
