= Western Turkic Khaganate =

581–657 CE monarchical state

Western Turkic Khaganate 𐰆𐰣:𐰸:𐰉𐰆𐰑𐰣 On oq budun
- 581–657
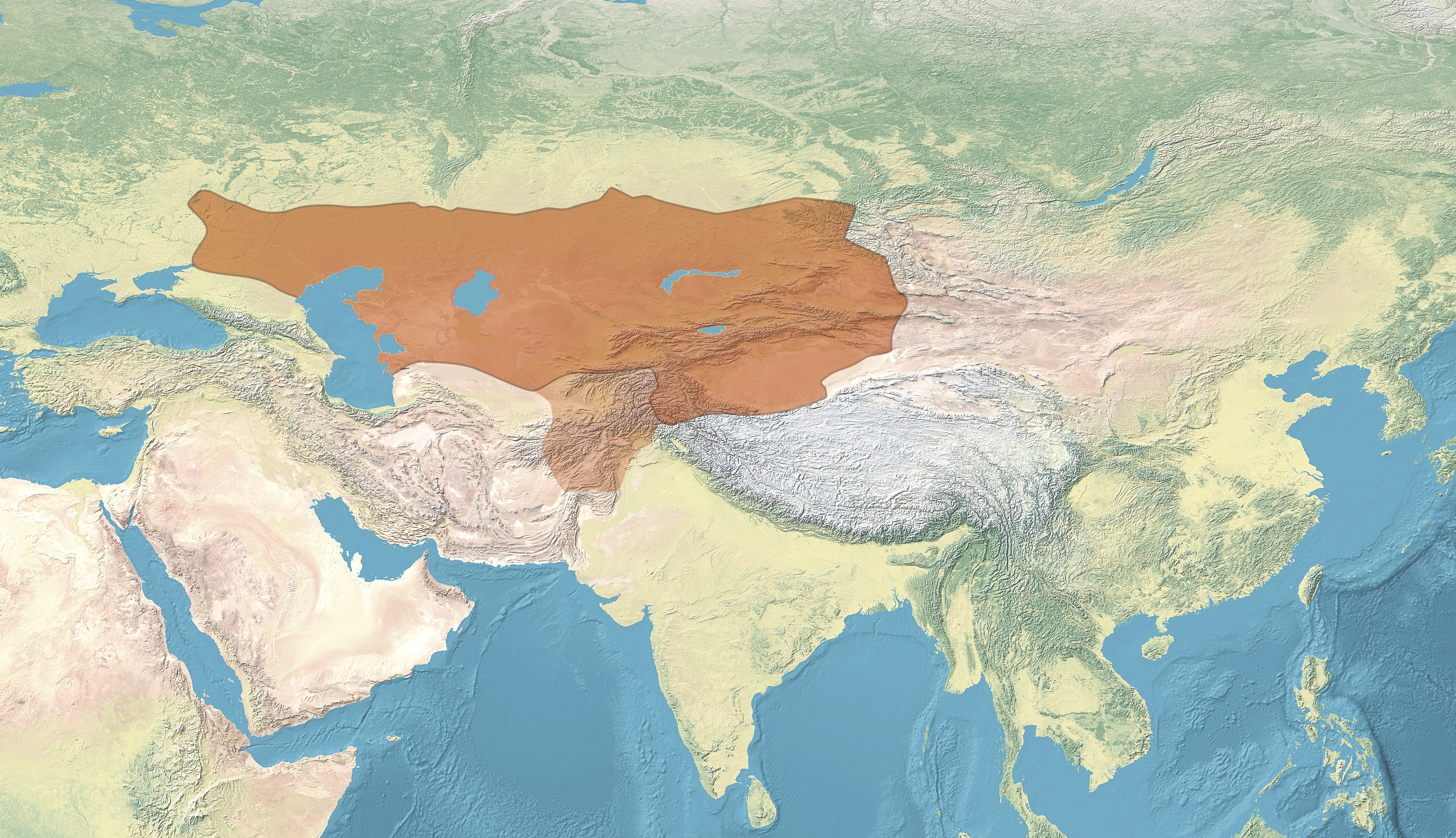
- Greatest extent of the Western Turkic Khaganate c. 625, after the Battle of Bukhara (light brown), and their southern expansion as the Tokhara Yabghus and Turk Shahis (lighter brown)
- Status: Khaganate (Nomadic empire): Administrative region of the First Turkic Khaganate (581–603); Independent empire (603–657); Vassal of the Tang dynasty (657–742)
- Capital: Navekat (summer capital); Suyab (principal capital)
- Common languages: Sogdian (coinage, official); Old Turkic
- Religion: Tengrism; Buddhism; Zurvanism; Fire worship
- Khagan of the Western Khaganate
  - 587–604: Niri Qaghan
- Yabgu of the Western Khaganate
  - 553–576: Istämi
  - 576–603: Tardu
- Historical era: Early Middle Ages

Area
- 630: 3,500,000 km^{2} (1,400,000 sq mi)
Preceded by
Hephthalites
First Turkic Khaganate
Succeeded by
Protectorate General to Pacify the West
Turgesh
Oghuz Yabgu State
Khazar Khaganate
Kangar union
Tokhara Yabghus
Second Turkic Khaganate

The Western Turkic Khaganate (Chinese: 西突厥; pinyin: Xī Tūjué) or Onoq Khaganate (Old Turkic: 𐰆𐰣:𐰸:𐰉𐰆𐰑𐰣, romanized: On oq budun, lit. 'Ten arrow people') was a Turkic khaganate in Eurasia, which formed as a result of the wars during the beginning of the 7th century (593–603) after the First Turkic Khaganate, which was founded in the 6th century on the Mongolian Plateau by the Ashina clan, split into a western and eastern khaganate.

The confederation as a whole was called Onoq, meaning "ten arrows". According to a Chinese source, the Western Turks were organised into ten divisions.

The khaganate's capitals were Navekat, the summer capital and Suyab, which was the principal capital, both situated in the Chui River valley in Kyrgyzstan, to the east of Bishkek. Tong Yabgu's summer capital was near Tashkent and his winter capital Suyab.

The Western Turkic Khaganate was subjugated by the Tang dynasty in 657 and the Western Turkic tribes were split up under two puppet rulers, Ashina Buzhen and Ashina Mishe. Mishe was killed by Buzhen in 662 and Buzhen was killed in 666. The Tang tried to install their sons, Ashina Huseluo and Ashina Yuanqing as successors in 685, but they failed to maintain control over their territory and fled back to the Tang by 690. In the west, the breakup of the Western Turkic Khaganate led to the rise of the Turkic Khazar Khaganate (c. 650–969).

== History ==
The First Turkic Khaganate was founded by Bumin in 552 on the Mongolian Plateau and quickly spread west toward the Caspian Sea. Within 35 years the Western Turkic Khaganate and the Eastern Turkic Khaganate were independent polities. The Western Khaganate reached its peak under Tong Yabghu Qaghan (618–630). After Tong's murder, there were conflicts between the Dulu and Nushibi factions and many short-lived Khagans, and some territory was lost. From 642 onward, the expanding Tang dynasty began to interfere. The Tang destroyed the khaganate in 657–659.

=== Western expansion (552–575) ===
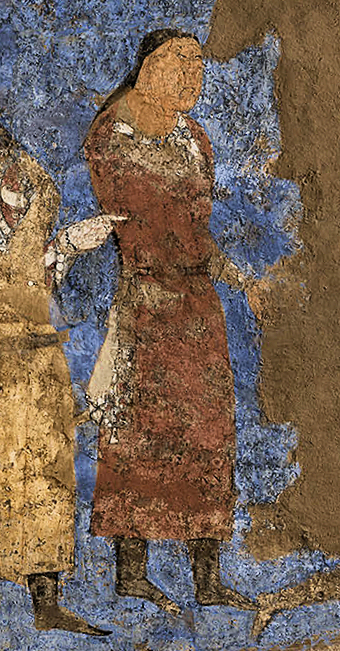
Western Turk officers, one of them labeled as coming from Argi (Karashahr in modern Xinjiang), attending the reception of ambassadors by king Varkhuman of Samarkand. Afrasiab murals, 7th century CE. The Turks had a mainly East Eurasian appearance.

The Göktürks and Mongols were the only two empires to rule both the eastern and central steppe. The Göktürks were the first steppe empire to be in contact with the Byzantine Empire, Persia and China. Their expansion west from modern-day Mongolia is poorly documented. Lev Gumilyov gives the following. Bumin gave the west to his younger brother Istämi (553–575). The campaign probably began in the spring of 554 and apparently met little resistance. They took Semirechye and by 555 had reached the Aral Sea, probably on a line from the lower Oxus, across the Jaxartes, north of Tashkent to the western tip of the Tian Shan. They drove before them various peoples: Xionites, Uar, Oghurs and others. These seem to have merged into the Avars whom the Göktürks drove across the Volga River in 558, and who crossed the western steppe and reached Hungary by 567. The Turks then turned southeast.

At this time the Hephthalites held the Tarim Basin, Fergana, Sogdia, Bactria and Merv, with the Persians at approximately their present border. Khosrow I made peace with the Byzantines and turned on the Hephthalites. Fighting started in 560. The Persians won a victory in 562, and the Turks took Tashkent. In 565, the Hephthalites were defeated at Qarshi and withdrew to Bactria, where fragments of their people remained until the Arab conquest. The Turks demanded the tribute formerly paid to the Hephthalites and when this was refused, they crossed the Oxus, but thought better of it and withdrew. In 571 a border was drawn along the Oxus, the Persians expanding east to Afghanistan, and the Turks gaining the Sogdian merchant cities and their control of the Silk Road.

Around 567–576, the Turks took the area between the Caspian and Black Seas. In 568 they took part of Bactria.

=== Late period (575–630) ===
Coin with legend "Türk-Kagan" (Sogdian script twrk x'γ'n), Tashkent, Western Turk period, 580-610.

Istämi was followed by his son Tardu (575–603). Around 581 he intervened in the eastern Göktürk civil war. In 588–589 the Turks were defeated by Persians near Herat in the first Perso-Turkic War. In 599–603 he gained the eastern half of the Khaganate, but after his death the two halves were split again. Heshana Qaghan (603–611) was driven out of Dzungaria and then defeated by Shikui Khagan (610–617), Tardu's grandson.

Shikui Khagan conquered the Altai, reconquered Tashkent and vanquished the Sasanids and the Hephthalites c. 616–617, raiding Iran as far as Ray and Isfahan.

==== Tokhara Yabghus and Turk Shahis ====
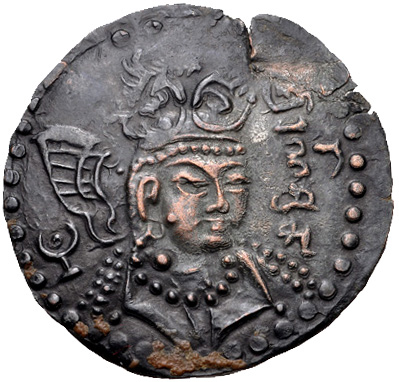
An early Turk Shahi ruler named Sri Ranasrikari "The Lord who brings excellence through war" (Brahmi script). In this realistic portrait, he wears the Turkic double-lapel caftan. Late 7th to early 8th century.

Shikui Khagan's brother Tong Yabghu Qaghan (618–630) ruled from the Tarim basin to the Caspian Sea, and met Xuanzang. He sent men to fight the Persians south of the Caucasus, and also sent his son Tardush Shad to fight in Afghanistan, where he established the Tokhara Yabghus, who themselves projected the Turk Shahis as far east as India.

In the year of Tong's death the Tang dynasty defeated and annexed the Eastern Khaganate. He was murdered by his uncle Külüg Sibir (630) with Duolu support. The Nushibi put Tong's son Sy Yabgu (631–633) on the throne. However, Nushibi quickly rebelled against Sy and enthroned Ashina Nishu as Duolu Qaghan (633–634), followed by his brother Ishbara Tolis (634–638). There was a Dulu-Nushibi conflict and Yukuk Shad (638–642), son of the final eastern khagan, was brought in.

The factions quarreled and the Nushibi and Emperor Taizong of Tang enthroned Irbis Seguy (642–651). The Tang dynasty demanded part of the Tarim Basin and then seized part of it until the war ended with Taizong's death. Irbis was overthrown by Ashina Helu (651–658) who, after about six years of war, was defeated at Battle of Irtysh River and captured by the Tang. After this there were several puppet khagans. From 679 to 719 the old Göktürk capital of Suyab was one of the Four Garrisons of Anxi. The Tang dynasty exercised control over the area until the time of An Lushan's rebellion in 756.

=== Tang campaigns against the Western Turks (640–657) ===
From 640 to 648, the Tang dynasty conquered the oasis states of the Tarim Basin that were previously allied with the Western Turks. Gaochang was conquered in 640. Karasahr became alarmed by the Tang's military expansionism and allied with the Western Turks. In 644, a military campaign was dispatched by the Tang emperor against Karasahr. Led by Commander Guo Xiaoke, protectorate-general of the Anxi Protectorate, the army marched towards Karasahr from Yulduz under the cover of night. The Tang forces mounted a surprise attack at dawn, resulting in the defeat of a Western Turk army and the capture of Karasahr's king. Karasahr returned to being a Tang tributary. Karasahr rebelled again in 648 with the aid of Kucha and the Western Turks. Another campaign was launched by the Tang against Karasahr under the command of Ashina She'er, a Turkic commander in the Tang military. After conquering Karasahr again, She'er defeated Kucha as well as their Western Turk allies.

Following the conquest of the western oasis states, Ashina Helu, a former Tang general in Gansu, declared himself qaghan of the Western Turks, unifying the Turkic tribes under a single khaganate. Helu invaded the kingdoms of the Tarim Basin and led frequent raids against bordering Tang cities. In 651, Helu captured Beshbalik. The Tang sent a force of 20,000 Chinese soldiers and 5,000 Uyghur cavalry against the Western Turks, driving them from Beshbalik. Emperor Gaozong sent an army led by Su Dingfang to defeat the Western Turks in 657. The Turkic commanders Ashina Mishe and Ashina Buzhen, rivals of Helu, led the side divisions.

Ten thousand Uyghur horsemen participated in the campaign as allies of the Tang. Porun, a Uyghur leader enthroned by Emperor Taizong, oversaw the Uyghur cavalry as a vice commander. He served under the leadership of the Yanran protector-general and vice protector-general, administrators of the Yanran Protectorate. The army departed from Ordos in March and traversed through 4,800 km (3,000 mi) of steppes and desert, without stopping by the oasis kingdoms for supplies. Along the way, tribes like the Chumkun and Su offered additional reinforcements. The troops reached Kyrgyzstan by November, enduring the harsh conditions of winter.

Su Dingfang defeated Helu's army of 100,000 cavalry at the battle of Irtysh River, fought along the Irtysh River in the Altai Mountains region. Helu had been caught off guard by Su's ambush and suffered many casualties. The Qaghan attempted to flee to Tashkent, but was caught the next day and sent to the Tang capital as a prisoner. The remaining tribes of the Western Turks surrendered. Gaozong pardoned Helu, but he died the following year.

=== Remnants ===
==== Tang puppet rulers ====
Statue of a Western Turk Khagan at the Chinese court

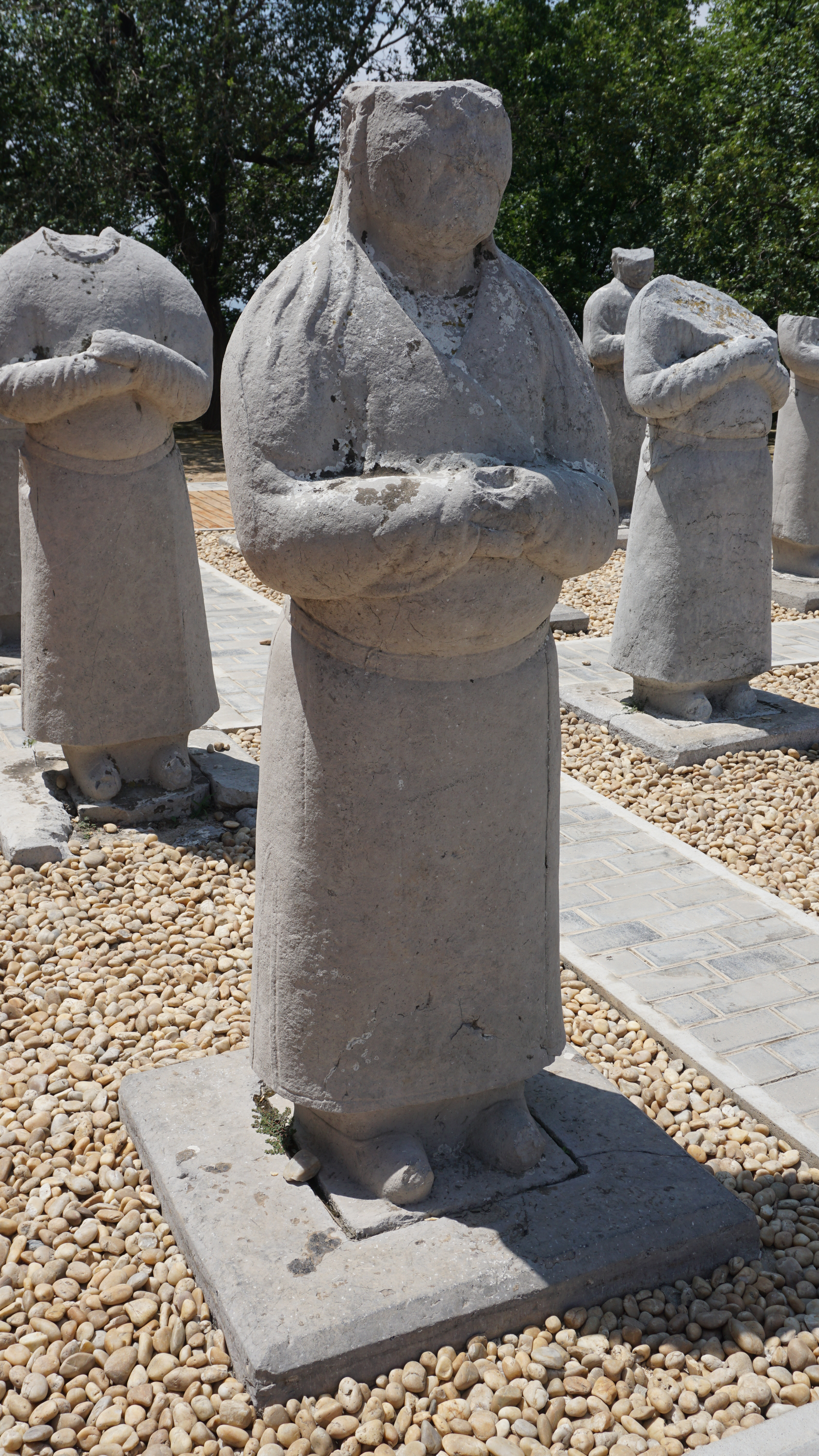
Front, with double-parked tunic

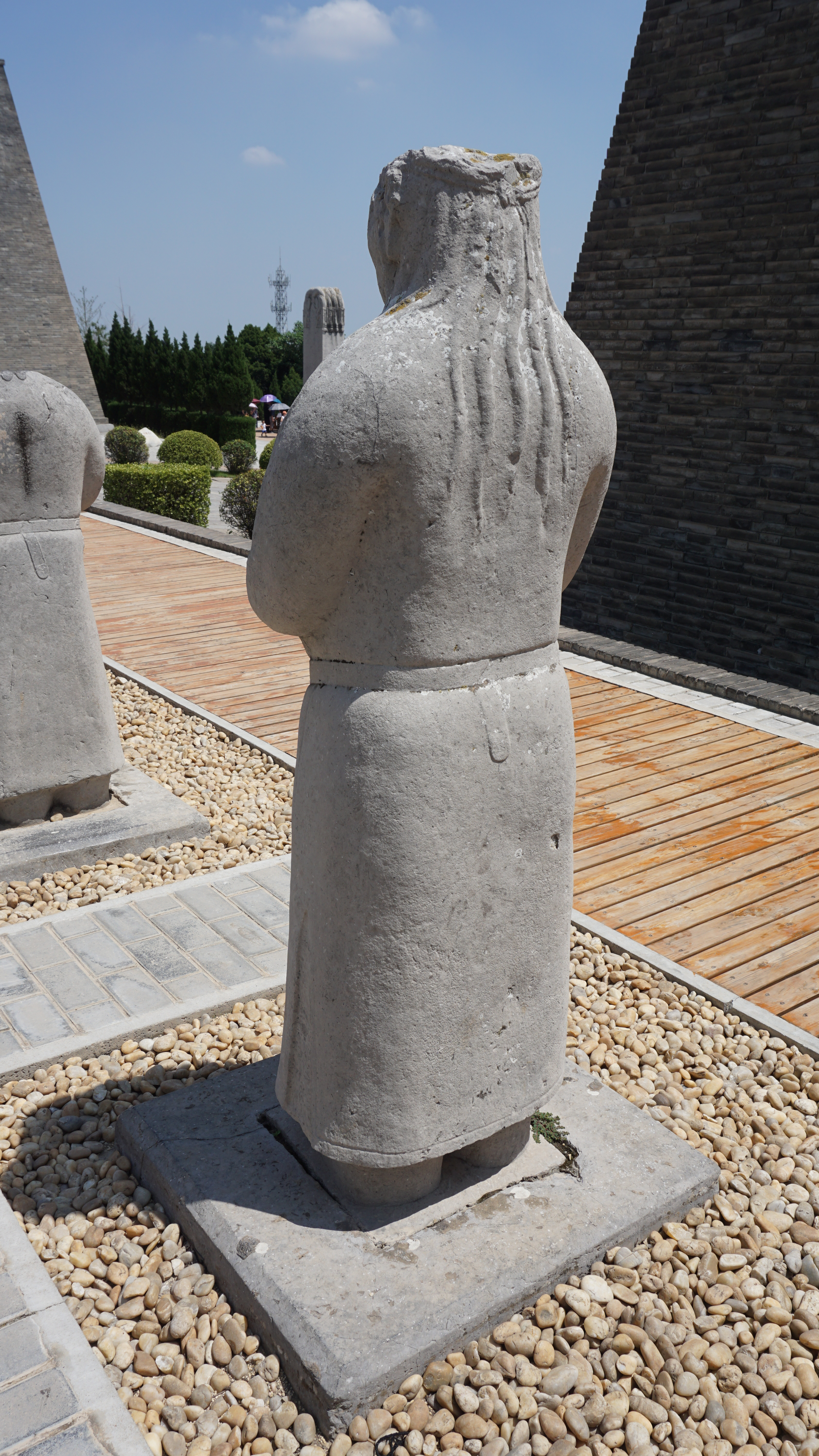
Back, with long braids

Statue of a Western Turk Khagan among the statues of "61 foreign officials" at the Qianling Mausoleum, circa 705.

After the defeat of Ashina Helu in 657, the Tang emperor Gaozong installed two puppet qaghans, the cousins Ashina Buzhen and Ashina Mishe, to control the former territory of the Western Turks by proxy. Buzhen and Mishe were enemies of Helu who had aided Su Dingfang during his campaign against Helu and the Western Turkic Khaganate. Gaozong divided the ten tribes of the area among the two cousins. Buzhen (Jiwangjue Qaghan) governed the five Nushibi tribes located in the west while Mishe (Xingxiwang Qaghan) governed the five Duolu tribes located in the east.

The son of Buzhen, Böri, and the son of Mishe, Yuanqing, resided in Chang'an, the Tang capital, while their fathers administered the former khaganate as qaghans. However, Mishe was killed by Buzhen in 662 and Buzhen was himself killed in 666. Empress Wu Zetian sent Yuanqing and Böri westward in 685 to succeed their fathers as proxy rulers.

Neither of the qaghans were able to successfully exert control. Turkic tribes resisted Yuanqing's rule and he was captured by the Tibetan Empire between 686-689. After his release, Yuanqing chose to return to the Tang instead of the Western Turks. He was executed in 692. Böri was able to bring the western tribes temporarily under his rule, but was defeated in 690 during an invasion by the Second Turkic Khaganate, and he too was forced to escape to the Tang along with 60,000 followers. Later attempts to install puppet qaghans failed, and the title was reduced to a symbolic position in the Tang court.

Efforts were made to install Böri's son, Ashina Huaidao, as ruler of the Western Turks in 699 and 700, but these attempts failed due to the rise of the Turgesh, who now dominated the Western Turks. The frontier general Guo Yuanzhen criticized the Tang court's policy of installing puppet qaghans because the descendants of the Ashina royal lineage no longer held sway over the Western Turks. They had spent too much of their lives in the Tang capital and the tribesmen could no longer relate to them. Instead they only created problems for the Anxi Protectorate.

Guo's criticisms were ignored and in 708, the Tang sent a failed military expedition to replace the Turgesh ruler Saqal with the son of Yuanqing, Ashina Xian. On 15 January 712, Xian was appointed by the Tang court to appease the Western Turks. In 717, Xian led Tang-allied Karluk forces to defeat the Turgesh and push them out of the Tarim Basin. He died a few years later in Chang'an. A final attempt to establish a puppet ruler over the Western Turks was made in 740 by dispatching Ashina Huaidao's son, Ashina Xin, to replace Kül-chor, the ruler of the Turgesh. Kül-chor was displeased with this move because he had assumed he was on good terms with the Tang for murdering Suluk, the previous Turgesh ruler. Kül-chor drove Ashina Xin from his territory and killed him a few years later. Xin's wife and child returned to Chang'an.

==== Ashina Duzhi's rebellion ====
By 671, the primary leaders of the Western Turks were Ashina Duzhi and Li Zhefu. The Tang tasked Duzhi with controlling the Wuduolu Turks. They initially cooperated with the Tang but rebelled against Tang authority in the late 670s. In 677, Duzhi declared himself Onoq Khagan, ruler of all Turks. He captured Kucha with the help of the Tibetans. A Tang army of 180,000 won an initial victory against the Tibetans at Koko nor but was subsequently defeated.

In 679 Tang envoys traveled to Tibet for negotiations while Tang forces mounted a surprise attack to recapture the Four Garrisons of Anxi. At the same time, the Tang general, Pei Xingjian, was accompanying Narsieh on an expedition to reclaim Persia before abandoning him in the Western Regions to fight the Turks. Another source indicates that the plan was always to attack the Western Turks and the escort mission was merely a pretext to capture the enemy chieftains. When Pei reached Xi Prefecture (Turpan), he recruited more than 1,000 men to accompany him further west. However he announced that their departure would be delayed until the autumn to avoid the summer heat, but this was to deceive Duzhi, whom Pei suspected of having spies observing him. Pei then invited the elites of the Tarim Basin on a large hunting expedition, gathering around him almost 10,000 men. When they neared Duzhi's court, Pei approached under the ruse of only wanting to meet Duzhi, who was caught by surprise and outnumbered. Duzhi went out with 500 men to meet Pei and they were all captured. Pei then used Duzhi's "treaty arrows" (qijian) to lure his followers in under the pretense of discussion, capturing them one by one. When Li Zhefu realized that the other Turkic tribes had been captured, he surrendered. Pei's deception resulted in the wholesale removal of the Western Turks' leadership, after which the Western Turks scattered and went into decline. Twenty years later, the leadership of the Western Turks was taken up by the Turgesh.

A stele was set up in Suyab commemorating the victory: "They had brought supplies for ten days, but they captured their opponent, Duzhi, right away, and then almost instantaneously captured Li Zhefu as well. Both Chinese and foreign people celebrated the victory together, setting up a stele in Suyab." Narsieh was able to maintain his many servants and a high quality of life. He continued to fight against the Muslim Arabs for twenty years. Upon returning to Tang, Pei was appointed the minister of rituals and Great general of the right flank guards.

== Relations with the Persians and Byzantines ==
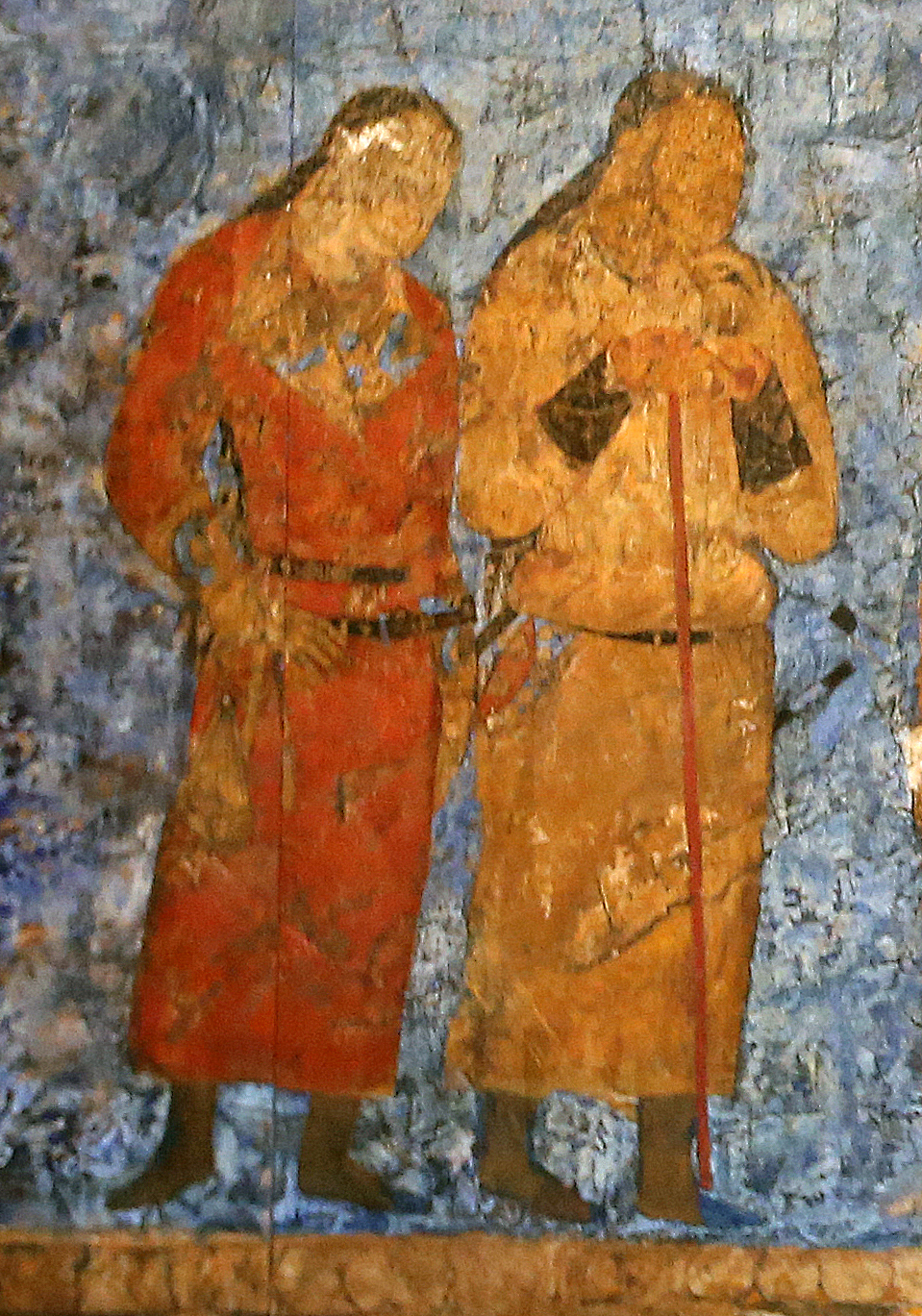
Turkic officers during an audience with king Varkhuman of Samarkand. 648-651, Afrasiyab murals, Samarkand.

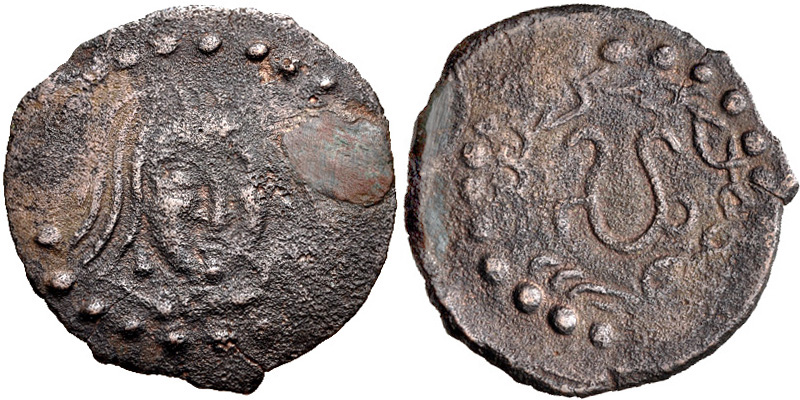
A Turkic nobleman with long plaited hair, from Tashkent. Coin of the Turkic dynasties of Chach. Circa 605–630.

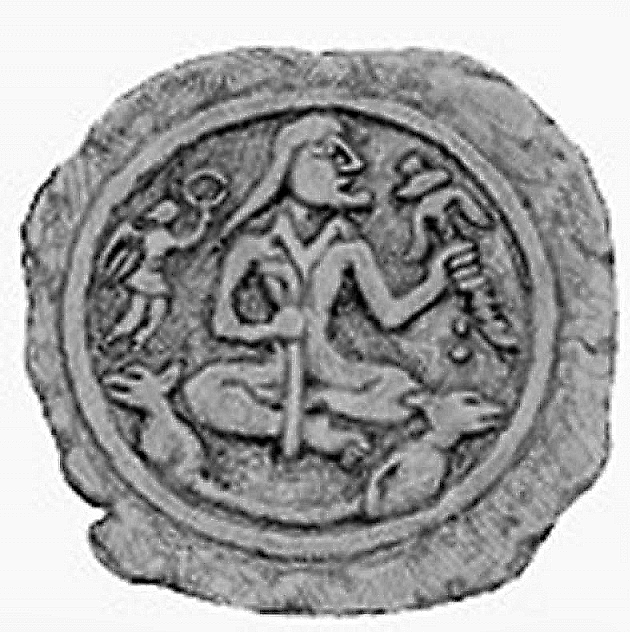
Ruler holding sword, in long fitted kaftan with wide right-hand opening. On the left, a flying Nike. Wolves at the bottom. Tamgha on the reverse:. Tashkent, 7-8th century.

During the late 6th century, the Turks consolidated their geopolitical position in Central Asia as the linchpin in trade between East Asia and Western Asia, in which Persia and the Byzantine Empire were the dominant powers. For much of this period, Istämi ruled the khaganate from a winter camp near Karashar. A timeline of the westward expansion of the Turks under Istämi might be reconstructed as follows:

- 552 Mongolia;
- 555 Aral Sea (probably);
- 558 Volga River (by defeating the Avars);
- 557–565 in alliance with the Persians, the Turks crushed the Hephthalites, after which a Turco-Persian border along the Oxus lasted several decades; * 564 Tashkent; 567–571 the North Caucasus;
- 569–571 Turks at war with Persia;
- 576 major incursion into the Black Sea area, including Crimea.

The first Turk legation (or embassy) to reach Constantinople visited Justin II in 563. A Sogdian merchant named Maniakh led a Turco-Sogdian legation to Constantinople in 568, pursuing trade and an alliance against the Avars and Persians. A Byzantine official named Zemarchus accompanied Maniakh on his return journey, and later left an account of the Turks. Maniakh now proposed to bypass the Persians and re-open a direct route north of the Caspian Sea. If trade on this route later increased (uncertain), it would have benefited Khorezm and the Black Sea cities and might have had something to do with the later rise of the Khazars and Rus' people.

The Turks' control of the Sogdian merchant cities along the Oxus from the late 6th century on gave the Western Turks substantive control of the central part of the Silk Road. A Chinese general complained that the:

"Turks themselves are simple-minded and short-sighted and dissention can easily be roused among them. Unfortunately, many Sogdians live among them who are cunning and insidious; they teach and instruct the Turks."

Denis Sinor saw the Byzantine alliance as a Sogdian scheme to benefit themselves at the expense of the Turks. A related fact is that the Eastern Turks extracted a large amount of silk as booty from the Chinese, which had to be marketed westward. Before 568, Maniakh, a leading merchant, visited the Sassanian Persian court, in a bid to open up trade; this proposal was refused, apparently because the Persians wanted to restrict trade by and with the Byzantines. The members of a second Turk legation to Persia were reportedly poisoned. From 569, the Turks and Persia were at war until the Turks were defeated near Merv; hostilities ceased in 571.

In 576, Valentinus led a Byzantine mission to a Turxanthos whose camp was west of the Caspian. Valentinus wanted action against the Persians and Turxanthos complained that Byzantium was harboring the Avars. Valentinus then went east to meet Tardu. What caused this hostility is not clear. In 576–577, a Turkic general called Bokhan and an Utigur called Anagai captured the Crimean Byzantine town of Panticapaeum and failed at a siege of Chersonesus. This marks the westernmost extent of Turkic power.

A major incursion into Bactria by the Turks, in 588 and 589, was defeated by the Sasanians. The Turk-Byzantine alliance was revived in the 620s during the last great Byzantine-Persian war before the Arab conquests. In 627 Tong Yabghu Qaghan sent out his nephew Böri Shad. The Turks stormed the great fortress of Derbent on the Caspian coast, entered Azerbaijan and Georgia, did a good bit of looting and met Heraclius who was besieging Tiflis. When the siege dragged on, the Turks left, and Heraclius went south and won a great victory over the Persians. The Turks returned, captured Tiflis and massacred the garrison. On behalf of the Byzantines, a Turkic general named Chorpan Tarkhan then conquered most of Armenia.

== Onoq or ten tribes ==
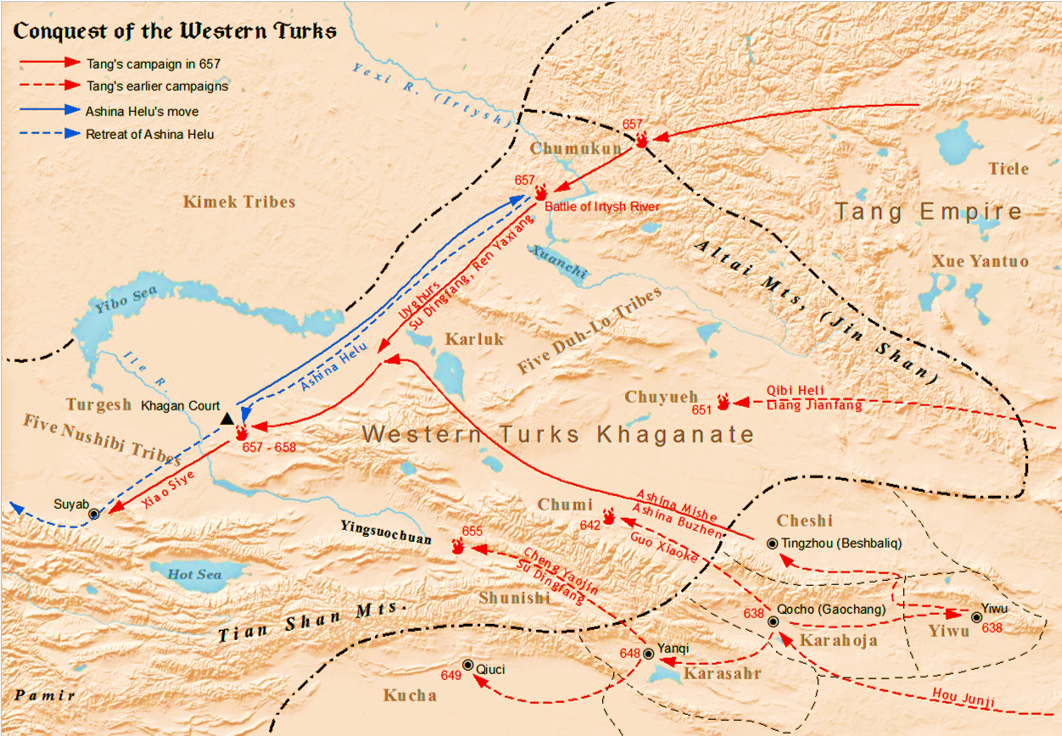
Tang dynasty military campaigns against the Western Turks

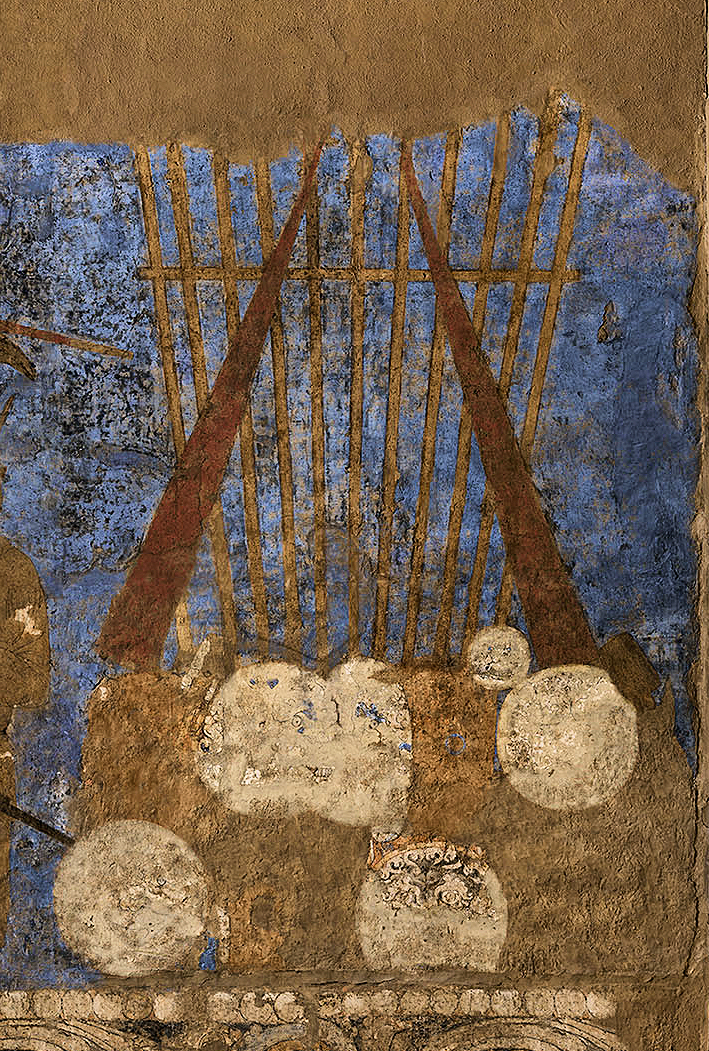
Federal symbol of the Western Turks circa 650. Eleven poles symbolizing the five Dulu tribes, the five Nushibi tribes, with the central pole symbolizing the rulership of a Yabghu-Qaghan. Afrasiab murals.

There are two contradicting accounts of the origin of the Onoq:

In the beginning [after 552], Shidianmi [Istämi] followed the Shanyu [Qaghan] and commanded the ten great chiefs. Together with their 100,000 soldiers, he marched to the Western Regions and subdued the barbarian statelets. There he declared himself as qaghan, under the title of ten tribes, and ruled them [the western barbarians] for generations.

— Tongdian, 193 and Jiu Tangshu, 194

Soon [after 635], Dielishi Kehan [of the Western Göktürks] divided his state into ten parts, and each was headed by one man; together they made up the ten shads (設 she). Every shad is given an arrow by him; they were known as the ten arrows. He also divided the ten arrows into two factions, each consisted of five arrows. The left (east) faction consisted of five Duolu tribes, headed by five churs (啜 chuo) separately. The right [west] faction consisted of five Nushibi tribes, headed by five irkins (俟斤 sijin) separately. Each took command of one arrow and called themselves the ten arrows. Thereafter, each arrow was also known as one tribe, and the great arrow head as the great chief. The five Duolu tribes inhabited the east of Suiye [water] (Chu River), and the five Nushibi tribes to the west of it. Since then, they called themselves the ten tribes.

— Tongdian, 193 and Jiu Tangshu, 194

The first statement dates their origin back to the beginning of the First Turkic Khaganate with Istämi, younger brother of Bumin Qaghan, who had brought with him the ten tribes, probably from the Eastern Qaghanate in Mongolia and travelled west to expand the Khaganate. The exact date for the event was not recorded, and the shanyu here referred to might be Muqan Qaghan.

The second statement attributes it to Dielishi, who took over the throne in 635 and began to strengthen the state by further affirming the initial ten tribes and two tribal wings, in contrast with the rotation of rule between the Bumin (through Apa) and Istämi (through Tardu) lineages in the Western Khaganate. Thereafter, the name "ten tribes" (十姓) became a shortened address for the Western Turks in Chinese records. Those divisions did not include the five major tribes, who were active further east of the ten tribes.

The earlier tribes consisted of eight primary tribes ruled by eight chiefs-in-command: the five Duolu (咄陆) tribes, and the three Nushibi tribes. Syriac and Greek sources (John of Ephesus, Menander Protector) also confirmed that initially, the Western Turkic Khaganate were divided into eight tribes during Istämi's lifetime and at his death.

The ruling elites were divided into two groups and the relationship between the two groups was tense: the more aristocratic Duolu shads held the title churs, and the lower-ranking Nushibi in west were probably initially made up of Tiele conscripts and their shads held the title irkins. During the reformation the more powerful Nushibi tribes such as A-Xijie and Geshu were sub-divided into two tribal groups with a greater and lesser title under a fixed tribal name, resulting in the attested On Oq & 十箭 shíjiàn "ten arrows").

== Primary sources ==
=== Afrasiab murals (7th century) ===
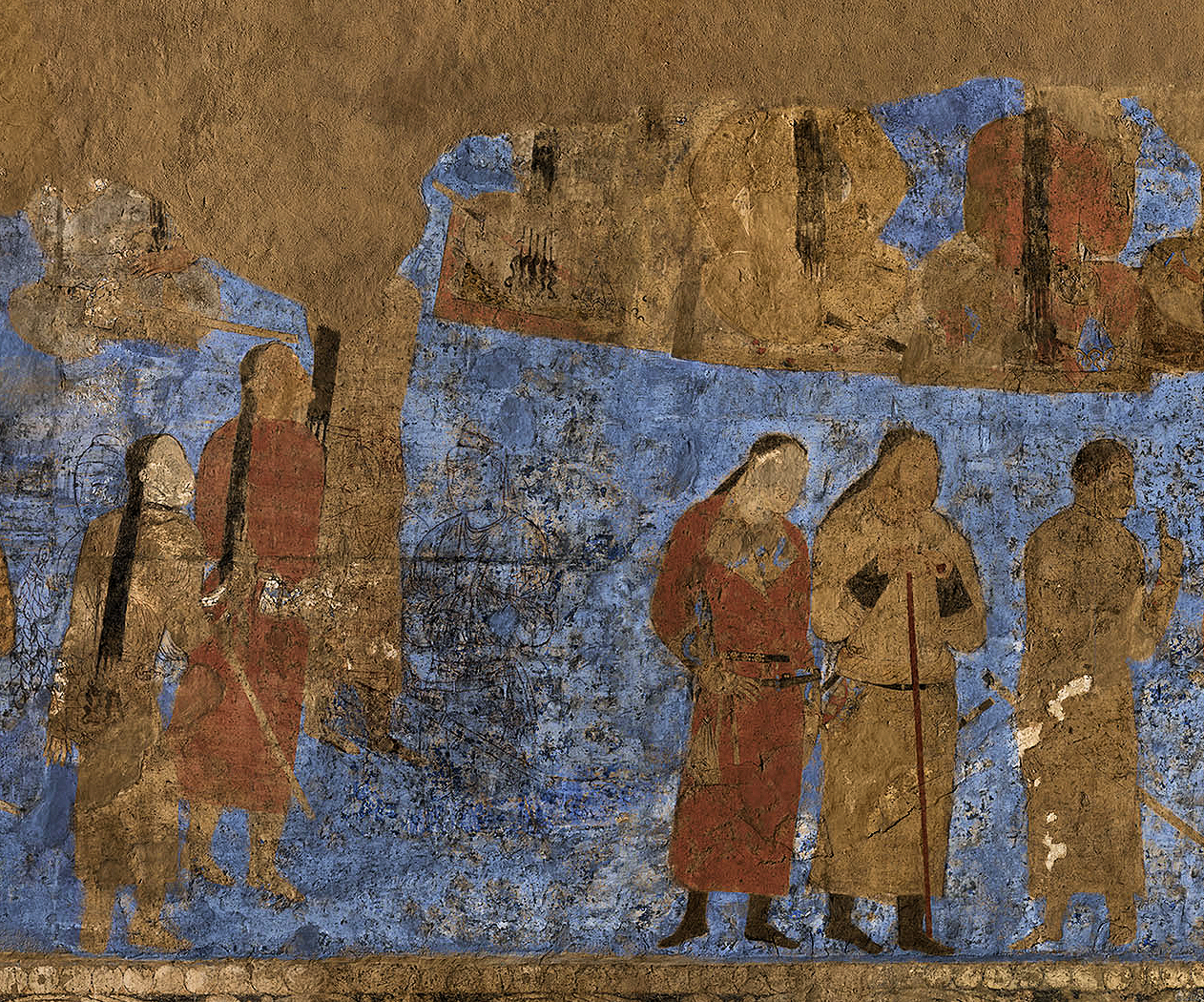
Western Turk attendants and officers, all recognizable by their long plaits, at the court of Samarkand. Afrasiab murals, 7th century.

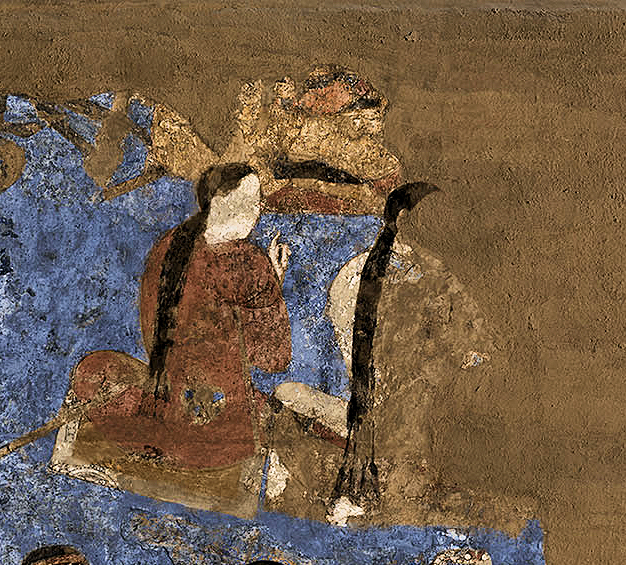
Seated Turkic attendants, at the court of Samarkand. Afrasiab murals, 7th century.

Turkic delegates appear together with Chinese envoys in the 7th century murals of Afrasiab in Samarkand. The Chinese delegates (left in the mural) form an embassy to the king of Samarkand, carrying silk and a string of silkworm cocoons. The Turkic delegates (right in the mural) are recognisable by their long plaits. They do not carry presents, as they are only escorting the Chinese envoys.

The scenes depicted in the Afrasiyab murals may have been painted in 648–651, as the Western Turkic Khaganate was in its last days, before its fall in 657, and the Tang dynasty was increasing its territory in Central Asia. They are recognisable by their long plaits.

==== Ethnic and sartorial characteristics ====
In the mural, the Western Turks are ethnic Turks, Nushibis, rather than Turkicized Sogdians, as suggested by the marked East Asian features and faces without beards. They are the most numerous ethnic group in the mural, and are not ambassadors, but rather military attendants. Their depiction offers a unique glimpse into the clothing of the Turks of the 6–7th century. They typically wear three or five long plaits, often gathered together into a one single long plait. They have ankle-length monochromic sleeved coats with two lapels. This fashion for the collar is first seen in Khotan near Turfan, a traditional Turkic land, in the 2nd–4th century CE. They have low black sharp-nosed boots. They wear gold bracelets with lapis lazuli or pearls. On Western Turkic coins, "the faces of the governor and governess are clearly mongoloid (a roundish face, narrow eyes), and the portrait have definite old Türk features (long hair, absence of headdress of the governor, a tricorn headdress of the governess)".

=== Orkhon Inscriptions ===
Bilge Khagan inscription, main side, 16:

powerful enemies kneel and proud ones bow. The Turgesh kagan (and his people) was our Turk. Because of their unawareness and foolishness, for their being traitorous, their kagan had died; his buyruqs and lords had died too. The On-Oq people suffered a great deal. In order the land (lit.: "earth and water"), which was ruled by our ancestors, not be left without a ruler, we organised the Az people and put them into order... was Barys bek.

Bilge Khagan inscription, 1st side, 1:

I, Tengri- llike and Tengri born Bilge kagan Turkic. Hear my words. When my father, Bilge Kagan Turkic, ruled, you, supreme Turk beks, lower Tardush beks, Shadapyt beks led by Kul Chur, the rest Tyules beks, Apa Tarkhan. Led by Shadapyt Beks, Bairuks, Tamgan Tarkhan, Tonyukuk, Boila Baga Tarkhan, Buyruqs..., Inner Buyruqs, led by Sebek Kul Erkin, all Buyruq beks! My father.

Bilge Khagan inscription, 2nd side: 15:

From sons of Ten Arrows to wives, see this. Erected stone inscriptions...

=== Tonyukuk inscription ===
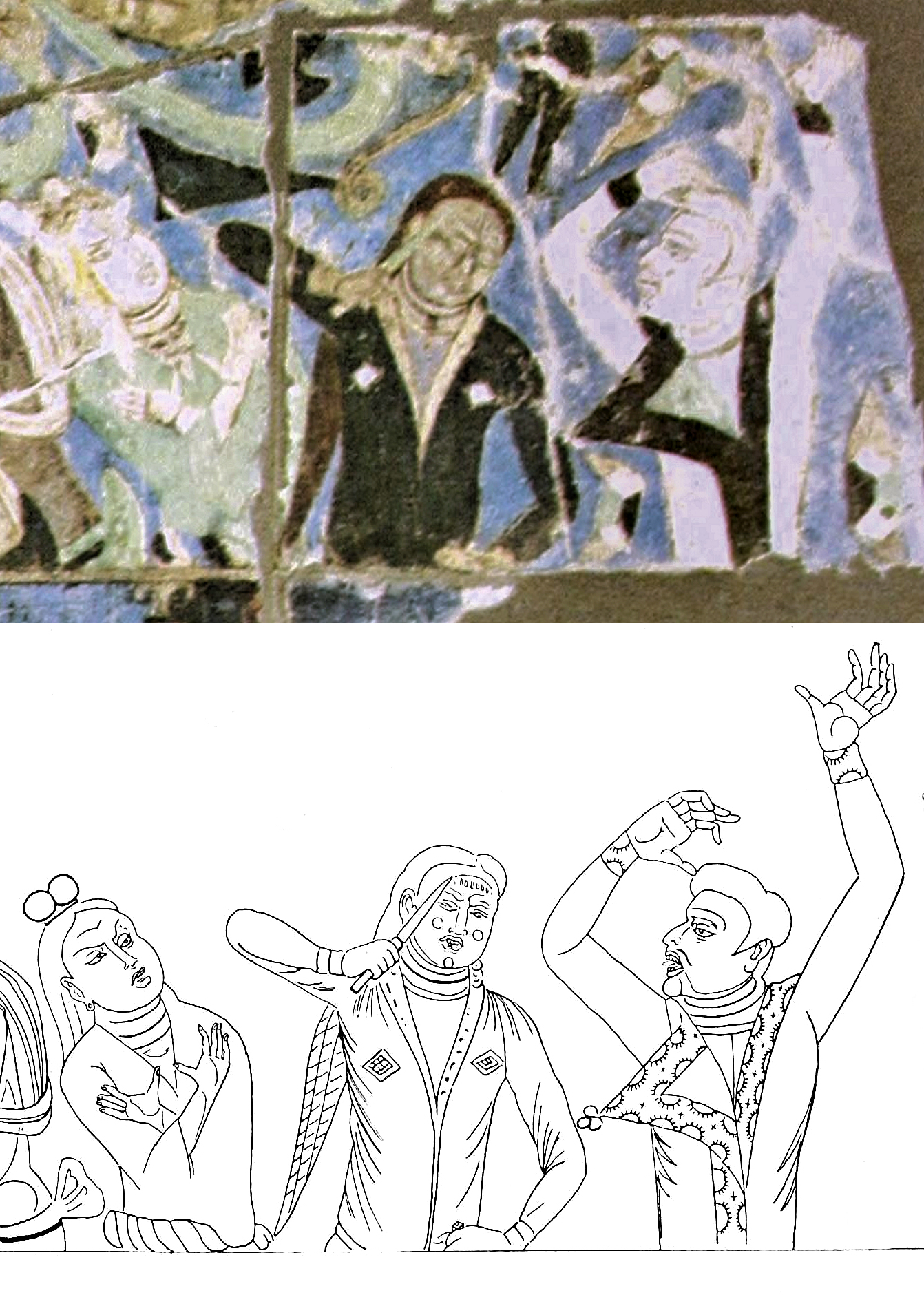
A Turk (center) mourning the Buddha, Maya Cave (Cave 224), Kizil Caves. He is cutting his forehead with a knife, a practice of self-mutilation also known among the Scythians.

Tonyukuk inscription, main side, 19:

I reached my army to Shantung towns and the seas. Twenty-three towns were destroyed. All of them had left on Usyn-bundatu land.(?). The Tabgaches' kagan (China) was our enemy. The kagan of "Ten Arrows" was our enemy.

Tonyukuk inscription, main side, 30:

... he might kill us". "So the Turkic kagan started out" – he said. "All Ten Arrows people started out" – he said. – "(among them) there is also Tabgaches' (China) army". Having heard these words, my kagan said: "I will be a kagan ..."

Tonyukuk inscription, main side, 33:

Three messengers came, their words were similar: "One kagan with his army went on campaign. The army of Ten Arrows people went on campaign too. They told that they would gather in the step of Yarysh". Having heard these words, I told them the kagan. What to do?! With the reply (from Khan)

Tonyukuk inscription, main side, 42–43:

Killed there. We took to prison about fifty persons. That night, we sent (messengers) to every nation. Having heard these words, the Beks and people of Ten Arrows all came and subdued. When I was settling down and gathering the coming beks and people, a few people ran away. I led to campaign the army of Ten Arrows people.

== Rulers of the Western Turkic Khaganate ==
=== Yabgus during the united empire (553–603) ===
Yabgu	reign	father, grandfather	Regnal name (Chinese reading)	Personal name (Chinese reading)
Istämi	553–576	Ashina Tuwu, Ashina	Shìdiǎn mì Kèhán	室點密; Shìdiǎnmì
Tardu	576–603	Istämi, Ashina Tuwu	Dátóu Kèhán	玷厥; Dianjue

=== Khagans during the independent Western Khaganate (603–658) ===
Kaghan	reign	father, grandfather	Regnal name (Chinese reading)	Personal name (Chinese reading)
Niri Qaghan	–	Yangsu Tegin, Muqan Qaghan	Nílì Kèhán	向氏; Xiàngshì
Heshana Qaghan	604–611	Niri Qaghan; Yansu Tegin	Chùluó Kèhán	達曼; Daman
Shikui Khagan	611–618	Tulu Tegin, Tardu	Shèguì Kèhán	射匮; Shèguì
Tong Yabghu Qaghan	618–628	Tulu Tegin, Tardu	Tǒng yèhù Kèhán	統葉; Tǒng yèhù
Külüg Sibir	628–630	Tardu, Istämi	Qūlìqí pí Kèhán	莫贺咄; Mòhèduō
Sy Yabghu Qaghan	631–632	Tong Yabghu Qaghan, Tulu Tegin	Yǐpí (shā)bōluō sìyèhù Kèhán	阿史那咥力; Āshǐnà xilì
Duolu Qaghan	633–634	Bagha Shad, Yangsu Tegin	Duōlù Kèhán	阿史那泥孰; Āshǐnà Níshú
Ishbara Tolis	634–639	Bagha Shad, Yangsu Tegin (son of Mukan Qaghan)	Shābōluō Kèhán	阿史那咥力; Āshǐnà Tóng
Yukuk Shad	639–642	Illig Qaghan, Yami Qaghan	Yǐpí duōlù Kèhán	阿史那欲谷; Āshǐnà Yùgǔ
Irbis Seguy	642–650	El Kulug Shad, Ishbara Tolis	Yǐpí shèkuì Kèhán	阿史那莫賀咄; Āshǐnà Mòhèduō
Ashina Helu	651–658	Böri Shad, Bagha Shad	Shābōluō Kèhán	阿史那賀魯; Āshǐnà Hèlǔ

Claimants

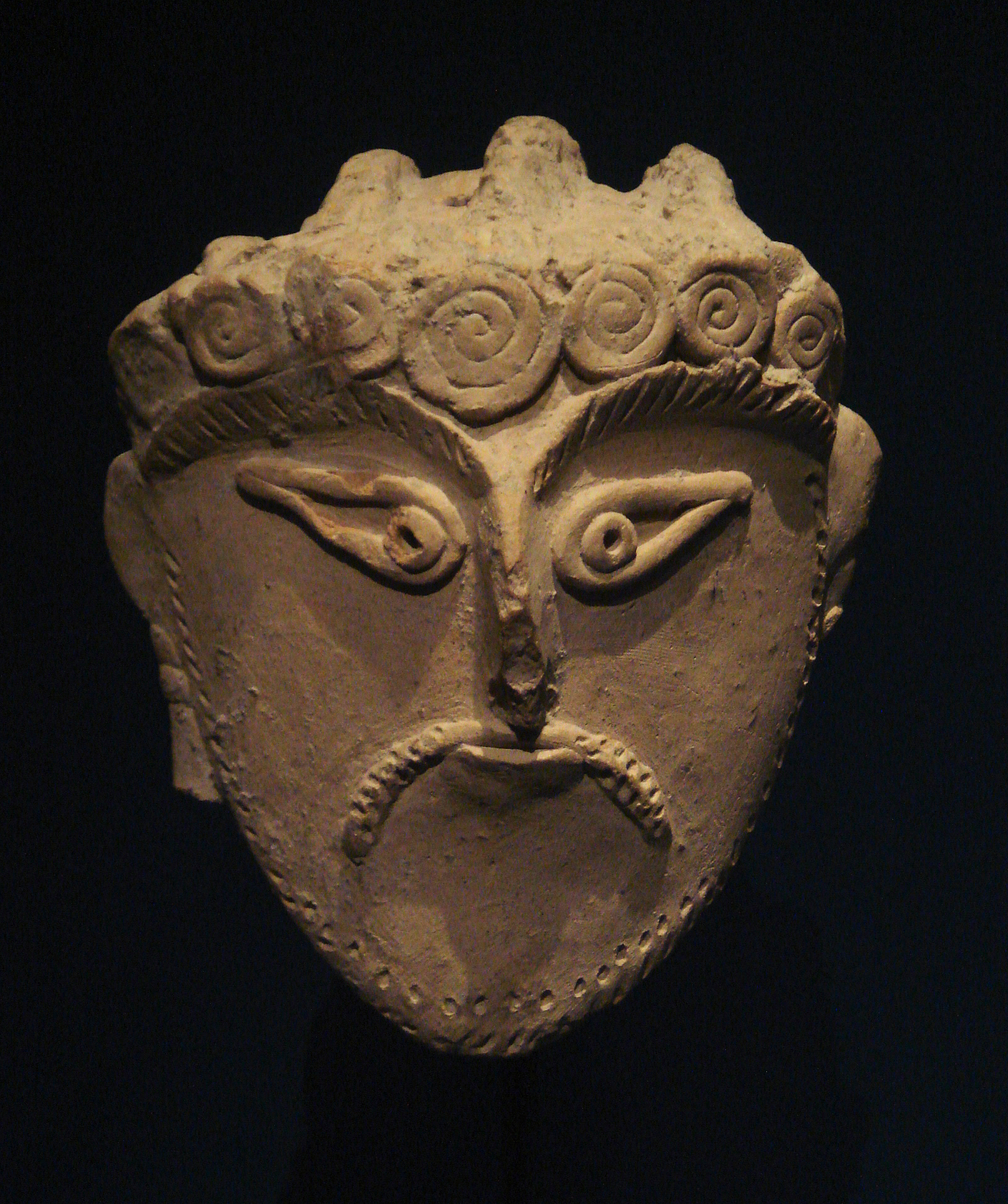
Turkic head, Afrasiyab, Samarkand, 5-7th century.

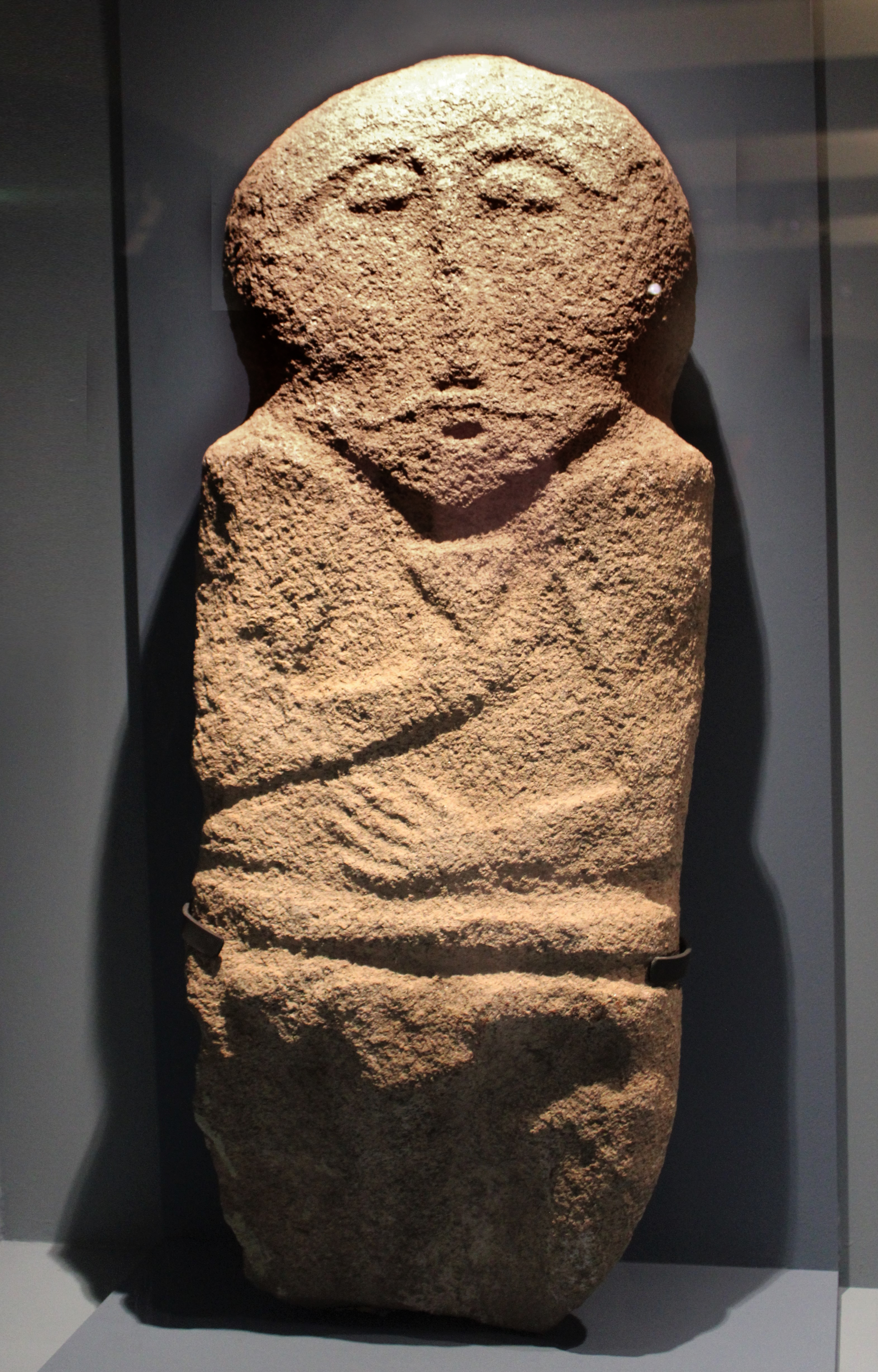
Western Turk balbal tombstone. Djirgatai, Tajikistan, 6-7th century.

- El Kulug Shad 639–640 (Nushibi-chief)
- Irbis Ishbara Yabgu Qaghan 640–641 (Nushibi-chief)

Later claimants

- Ashina Duzhi 676–679 (allied with Tibetan Empire)
- Ashina Tuizi 693–700 (allied with Tibetan Empire)

=== Khagans under Tang suzerainty (657–742) ===
Kunling Protectorate (657–736)

- Ashina Mishe (657–662)
- Ashina Yuanqing (685–692)
- Ashina Xian (708–717)
- Ashina Zhen (735–736)

Mengchi Protectorate (657–742)

- Ashina Buzhen (657–667)
- Ashina Huseluo (693–704)
- Ashina Huaidao (704–708)
- Ashina Xin (740–742)

== See also ==
- Gao Changgong
- History of the central steppe
- List of khagans of the Göktürks
- Oghuz Turks (possibly linked to the Western Turkic tribe 姑蘇 Gūsū < Middle Chinese *kuo-suo)
- Turks in the Tang military
- Turkic peoples
- Timeline of the Turkic peoples (500–1300)

== Sources ==
- Alram, Michael; Filigenzi, Anna; Kinberger, Michaela; Nell, Daniel; Pfisterer, Matthias; Vondrovec, Klaus (2012–2013). "The Countenance of the other (The Coins of the Huns and Western Turks in Central Asia and India) 2012–2013 exhibit". Vienna, Austria: Kunsthistorisches Museum, Coin Cabinet. Archived from the original on 17 February 2021.

== Bibliography ==
- Baumer, Christopher (2012), The History of Central Asia: The Age of the Steppe Warriors, I.B. Taurus
- Beckwith, Christopher I (1987), The Tibetan Empire in Central Asia: A History of the Struggle for Great Power among Tibetans, Turks, Arabs, and Chinese during the Early Middle Ages, Princeton University Press
- Chen, Hao (2021), A History of the Second Türk Empire (ca. 682–745 AD), Brill.
- Christoph Baumer, History of Central Asia, volume 2, p. 174-206
- Grousset, René (1970). The Empire of the Steppes: A History of Central Asia. Rutgers University Press. ISBN 978-0-8135-1304-1.
- Lev Gumilyov, The Ancient Turks, 1967 (long account in Russian at: "Древние тюрки")
- Rezakhani, Khodadad (2017). ReOrienting the Sasanians: East Iran in Late Antiquity. Edinburgh University Press. pp. 1–256. ISBN 9781474400305.
- Saito, Shigeo (2017), Protection and Research on Cultural Heritage in the Chuy Valley, the Kyrgyz Republic, Institute of History and Cultural Heritage of the National Academy of Sciences of the Kyrgyz Republic
- Skaff, Jonathan Karem (2009). Nicola Di Cosmo (ed.). Military Culture in Imperial China. Harvard University Press. ISBN 978-0-674-03109-8.
- Skaff, Jonathan Karam (2012). Sui-Tang China and Its Turko-Mongol Neighbors: Culture, Power, and Connections, 580-800. Oxford University Press. ISBN 978-0-19-973413-9.
- Twitchett, Denis (2000). H. J. Van Derven (ed.). Warfare in Chinese History. BRILL. ISBN 978-90-04-11774-7.
- Wang, Zhenping (2013), Tang China in Multi-Polar Asia: A History of Diplomacy and War, University of Hawaii Press
- Wechsler, Howard J. (1979). "T'ai-tsung (reign 626–49) the consolidator". In Twitchett, Dennis (ed.). The Cambridge History of China, Volume 3: Sui and T'ang China, 589–906, Part I. Cambridge, England: Cambridge University Press. pp. 188–241. ISBN 978-0-521-21446-9.
- Williams, Nicholas Morrow (2025), Jade-Carving Chisel and Luminous Ocean, Brill
