= Sy Yabghu Qaghan =

Qaghan of the Western Turkic Khaganate
- Reign: 631–632
- Predecessor: Külüg Sibir
- Successor: Duolu Qaghan
- Born: Āshǐnà Xìlì 阿史那咥力
- Died: 633; Near Balkh
- House: Ashina
- Father: Tong Yabgu Qaghan
- Religion: Tengrism

Sy Yabghu Qaghan was a khagan in the Western Turkic Khaganate between 631 and 633 or 630 and 632. His full title was Yǐpí (shā)bōluō sì yèhù kèhán (乙毗(沙)钵罗肆叶护可汗; reconstructed Old Turkic: *Irbis ~ Yelbi (Ysh)bara Sir Yabghu Khagan); personal name: Ashina Xili (阿史那咥力).

== Reign ==
He was raised to throne with the support of Nushibi tribes and his cousin Nishu. However he was no more successful than his predecessor. He couldn't control the Xueyantuo and he executed so many people that even his former partisan Nishu planned to escape. After losing his supporters and prestige he escaped to south in 633. Nishu succeeded him as Duolu Qaghan.

== Later years ==
He tried to raid the city of Balkh (now in north Afghanistan), but was killed in the clash.

Sy Yabghu Qaghan Ashina Clan
Preceded by Külüg Sibir	Qaghan of the Western Turkic Khaganate; 631–633	Succeeded by Duolu Qaghan
