= Tardu =

Medieval ruler in Turkic Khaganate

Tardu Khagan

Yabghu of the First Turkic Khaganate
- Reign: 575–599

Qaghan of the First Turkic Khaganate
- Reign: 599–603
- Predecessor: Tulan Qaghan
- Successor: Yami Qaghan (in East); Niri Qaghan (in West)
- Died: 603
- Issue: Külüg Sibir
- House: Ashina
- Father: Istämi
- Religion: Tengrism

Tardu Qaghan, (Old Chinese:阿史那玷厥) also known as Bilge Qaghan (died 603), personal name Ashina Kara-Churin-Türk (Old Turkic: 𐱃𐰺𐰑𐰆𐱁), was ninth and last Qaghan of the First Turkic Khaganate. After his death or disappearance, the Qaghanate premanently divided in two. Tardu previously served as the second yabghu of the Western wing of the Qaghanate (c. 575–603), He was the son of Istämi Yabghu.

== Names ==
The regnal name in Turkic was Tarduš (Old Turkic: 𐱃𐰺𐰑𐰆𐱁), Medieval Greek: Ταρδου, 達頭可汗/达头可汗, Pinyin: dátóu kěhàn, Wade–Giles: ta-t'ou k'o-han, personal name: 阿史那玷厥, āshǐnà diànjué, a-shih-na tien-chüeh). According to Lev Gumilev his personal name was Kara-Churin-Turk (Кара Чурин Тюрк). However, when he subjugated the eastern half after the death of Tulan Qaghan, he assumed the regnal name Bilge (Wise) Khagan.

== Biography ==
=== Background ===
The Turkic Khaganate was a vast empire; from Manchuria and the Great Wall of China to the Black Sea. It was impossible to govern the whole khaganate from a single capital. So while the eastern part was directly ruled by the khagan (or qaghan), the western part was governed by the yabghu (vassal) on behalf of the khagan. The capital of the west was Ordukent (Suyab) (present-day Kyrgyzstan). Istämi, who was the Khagan's brother, was the first and Tardu (Istämi's son) was the second yabgu.

=== Years of civil war ===
Tardu became the yabgu in c. 575. That year, he met the Byzantine ambassador Valentinius. Being a very ambitious yabgu, he was planning to seize power over the entire khaganate. He saw his chance in 581 when Taspar Qaghan died. Taspar had announced his preference for Talopien (son of Muqan Qaghan) instead of his son Anluo. But the Göktürk kurultai (council of tribal leaders), which was authorized to appoint the new khagan, refused to follow the former khagan's will and appointed Anluo, who in turn acknowledged Ishbara Qaghan as the new khagan. This gave Tardu the necessary cause to interfere. He sent an army to back Talopien. Ishbara asked Sui China for protection and both sides were played off each other by China. While the east part of the khaganate suffered from civil war, Tardu was waiting for a suitable moment to realize his plans. After the Battle of Blarathon in 591 in Sassanid Persia, Bahram Chobin who was a short-term Sasanid emperor, sought asylum with the Western Turkic Khaganate.

== Reign ==
In 599 Tardu declared himself to be khagan of the united khaganate. However, his new status was not recognised widely. Probably to persuade the kurultai, he began a campaign against China. But unlike the Göktürks of the eastern part, his target of the campaign was too far away and his army suffered intensely from poisoned water wells during the long expedition through the steppe. Finally, he had to retreat without serious combat, and the defeat was disastrous for him. After a rebellion of his subjects, he disappeared (was likely killed) in 603 or 604.

He was succeeded in the west by Niri Qaghan, a son of Apa Qaghan, his cousin.

== Family ==
He was father to Tulu (都六) and Külüg Sibir. Shikui Khagan and Tong Yabghu Qaghan were his grandsons through Tulu.

Tardu Ashina Clan
Preceded by Istämi	Yabgu of the Western Turkic Khaganate; 575–599	Succeeded by Niri Qaghan (as khagan)
Preceded by Tulan Qaghan	Khagan of Turkic Khaganate; 599–603	Succeeded by Yami Qaghan
