= Heshana Qaghan =

Qaghan of the Western Turkic Khaganate
- Reign: 604–612
- Predecessor: Niri Qaghan
- Successor: Shikui Qaghan
- Born: 603; Suyab, Western Turkic Khaganate
- Died: 619; Chang'an, Tang dynasty
- Spouse: Princess Xinyi (信義公主)
- Issue: 2 sons
Names
- Ashina Daman (阿史那達曼)
Regnal name
- Heshana Qaghan (曷娑那可汗) or Yisanadu Qaghan (易薩那篤可汗) or Yipona Qaghan (易婆那可汗) or Nijue Chuluo Qaghan (泥厥處羅可汗)
- House: Ashina
- Dynasty: Western Turkic Khaganate
- Father: Niri Qaghan
- Mother: Lady Xiang (向氏)
- Religion: Tengrism

Heshana Qaghan (Chinese: 曷娑那可汗; pinyin: Hésuōnà Kèhán; Middle Chinese (Guangyun): [ɣɑt.sɑ˥˩nɑ˩ kʰɑ˥ɣɑn˩˥]), personal name Ashina Daman (阿史那達曼), alternative regnal name Nijue Chuluo Qaghan (泥厥處羅可汗), was the second monarch of the Western Turkic Khaganate. He was the son of Niri Qaghan. He appeared as Čôl χâɣân in Shahrestan-haye Iranshahr. He was appointed by the Tang dynasty as the Commandery Prince of Guiyi (歸義郡王).

== Reign ==
Ashina Daman was said have collected excessive taxes from the Tiele, leading to resentment among their tribes. Daman thus suspected the Tiele chieftains and, on one occasion, gathered some 100 Tiele chieftains and killed them. This led the Tiele to rebel and supported Geleng (歌楞), the chieftain of the Qibi (契苾), as the Yiwuzhenmohe Khan (易勿真莫賀可汗). They also supported Yishibo as Yiedie Khan, as a subordinate under Geleng. Around 605 Tiele rebels drove Daman from Dzungaria to the Ili River area.

Pei Ju suggested that Emperor Yang of Sui should form an alliance with Heshana's subordinate Shikui, who had been requesting to marry a Sui princess. The Emperor agreed and subsequently, Shikui attacked Heshana, defeating him and forcing him to flee to Gaochang. Emperor Yang then sent Pei to Gaochang to persuade Daman to come to the Sui. Daman refused at first. However, after being threatened that his mother would be killed, he agreed. He subsequently stayed in Sui China and did not return to his own land. Emperor Yang, pleased with this development, awarded Pei with a sable coat and jewels that Daman offered as tribute.

In 611, Emperor Yang made Heshana Qaghan (曷薩那可汗) by imperial decree and was married to Princess Xinyi (信義公主).

By 619, he was no longer in control of his khaganate and was at Chang'an, the capital of the Tang dynasty, when Emperor Gaozu of Tang, giving in to Shibi Qaghan's pressure, had him delivered to Eastern Turk emissaries to be executed.

He had two sons who were in service of the Tang dynasty at the time of his death.

Heshana Qaghan Ashina Clan
Preceded by Tardush Qaghan; Niri Qaghan	Qaghan of the Western Turkic Khaganate; 603–611	Succeeded by Shikui Qaghan
