= Duolu =

Turkic tribal confederation in the Western Turkic Khaganate (c. 581–659)

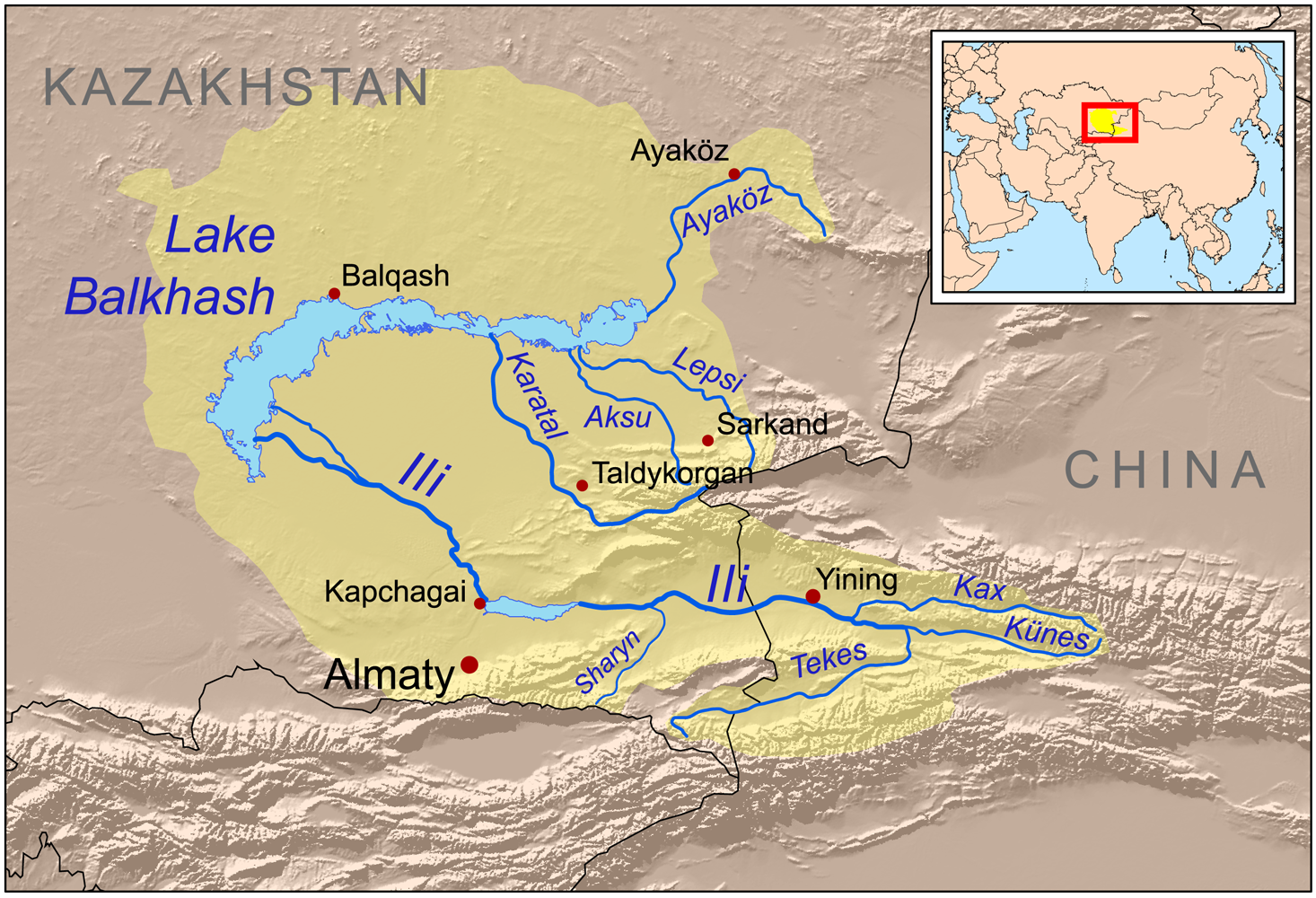
The lands of the Duolu were in the Ili River Basin

Duolu (Wade–Giles: To-lu; c. 603–651 as a minimum) was a tribal confederation in the Western Turkic Khaganate (c. 581–659). The Türgesh Khaganate (699–766) may have been founded by Duolu remnants.

There are several Chinese transcriptions including 咄陸 (Middle Chinese *tuɑt̚-lɨuk̚ > Mandarin Duōlù), 咄六 (MC. *tuɑt̚-lɨuk̚ > Mand. Duōliù), 都陸 (MC. *tuo-lɨuk̚ > Mand. Dōulù), and 都六 (MC. tuo-lɨuk̚ > Mand. Duōliù). The Old Turkic name behind those has been variously reconstructed as *Tör-ok, *Turuk, *Tuğluq, Tölük, Türük, and most recently Tuğluğ (𐱃𐰆𐰍𐰞𐰍) "have flags, have standards". (Note: For the etymology of tuğ see Tug (banner)#Early history)

There is confusion, or possibly connection, with the earlier Onogurs which also means 'ten tribes'. Additionally, Duolu's relation to the Dulo clan of the Bulgars is possible, but not proven.

Initially, the Western Turks might have organized themselves into eight tribes, consistent with statements by Syriac and Greek authors: John of Ephesus mentioned eight rulers of the Turks besides Istämi; and Menander Protector mentioned that at Istämi's death, the Western Turkic realm was divided into eight parts. Later on, two Nushibi tribes, Axijie and Geshu, reformed themselves, each sub-divided into two sub-tribes, bringing the total number to ten. Therefore, the Western Turks were also called the Onoq or 'ten arrows', that is 'ten tribes', five led the Duolu chors (chuo 啜) (Note: likely of Iranian origin, from čyaura- "to go out, hunt". See Bailey, H.W. "Khotanese Texts, VII" in Golden, Peter B. (1992). "An Introduction to the History of the Turkic People." Otto Harrassowitz, Wiesbaden.) and five by the Nushibi erkins (sijin 俟斤). (Note: "collected together in one place" from root irk- "to collect or assemble (things Acc.)"; compare Anatolian irkin ~ irkim "a hoard, a buried treasure". See Clauson, Gerard. (1972) An Etymological Dictionary of Pre-13th Century Turkish. Oxford University Press. In English. p. 221, 225)

They lived between Lake Balkhash and the Tian Shan Mountains. Their western neighbor was the Nushibi confederation which extended west to the Syr Darya and southward. The boundary between the two was around the Ili River and the Chu River, that is, near a line running south from the southwest corner of Lake Balkhash. The Nushibi had connections southwest with the literate Sogdian merchants. The Duolu were probably more pastoral. Rivers running down from the Tianshan supported agriculture and towns and thus a natural caravan route. The Duolu presumably taxed these people. The West Turkic khagans had a sort of capital at Suyab near the Duolu–Nushibi boundary.

From at least the time of Heshana Qaghan (603) new khagans were usually supported by either the Duolu or Nushibi faction. In 638 there was a separation of the two factions along the Ili River.

The Old Book of Tang and Tongdian record Duolu tribal names and titles:

Hanzi	Pinyin	Reconstructed Old Turkic
處木昆 (屈)律 啜	Chùmùkūn (Note: According to Togan (apud Babayarov 2003), this reflects Sogdian Jamuk (cf. 昭武 *t͡ɕiᴇu-mɨo^{X} > Zhāowŭ)) (qū)lǜ chuò	*Čomuqun (Note: "immersed in water", "drowned"; from čom-uq- ‘to drown’ (middle voice), < čom- "to sink in (water, etc. Loc.)" (Clauson, 1972: 422) + -(X)k- + -Xn. Zuev reconstructed *čumul qun (1962: 119), later čumuq qun (1967: 18; 1981: 66)) küli (Note: reconstructed by Kasai (2014:126); Tishin (2018:109) reconstructed külüg) čor,
胡祿屋 (Note: or 胡祿居 Húlùjū (Jiutangshu)) 闕 啜	Húlùwū què chuò	*Uluğ oq kül čor
摄舍提 暾 啜	Shèshètí tūn (Note: possibly an allograph of tŭtún 吐屯) chuò	*Čapšatā (Note: from Sogdian šāw/u (š’w) “black” & xšēδ (xšyδ) ‘chief, commander’ (< Avestan *xšaēta) & plural suffix -ā; cf. the “king of the Turks” Šāba ﺵﺍﺏﺓ mentioned by al-Ṭabarī, or Sāwa Šāh ﺱﺍﻭﻩ ﺵﺍﻩ, mentioned by Ferdowsī. Zuev (1998: 91-92) reconstructed here *Jebšed. Zuev (2002: 143-146) links the Black Prince Shu/Shav in Sogdian-Türgesh mythology to the Black Prince Shu mentioned by 11th-century Karakhanid scholar Mahmud al-Kashgari as well as to the legendary Iranian Siyâvash mentioned in the Avesta and Shahname) ton čor
突騎施 賀羅施 啜	Tūqíshī hèluóshī (Note: Stark (2007 & 2016) proposed that 賀羅施 might have transcribed the tribal name Khalaj) chuò	*Türügeš-Qalač čor
鼠泥施 處半 啜	Shǔníshī chùbàn chuò	*Šüŋiš (Note: Atwood (2013) also linked the personal name Shŭnĭ 鼠匿 *Šünrik, of a Türk ruler who'd conquered Ferghana, to 鼠泥施 *Šüŋiš and 蘇尼 *Süŋiš (or *Soni), all derivatives from süŋü and *süŋüš ~ süŋiš “soldier, war”, which are derived presumably with a variant šüŋi of the root.) čupan čor

== See also ==
- Duolu Qaghan

== Sources ==
- Alemany, Agustí (2009). "From Central Asia to the Balkans: the title *ču(b)-pān". In Allison, Christine; Joisten-Pruschke, Anke; Wendtland, Antje (eds.). Daēnā to Dîn: Religion, Kultur und Sprache in der iranischen Welt. Otto Harrassowitz Verlag. pp. 3–12. ISBN 9783447059176.
- Atwood, Christopher P. (2013). "Some Early Inner Asian Terms Related to the Imperial Family and the Comitatus". Central Asiatic Journal. 56. Archived from the original on June 15, 2020.
- Baumer, Christoph (2012). The History of Central Asia: The Age of the Steppe Warriors. Vol. 2. Bloomsbury. p. 205.
- Babayarov, Gaybullah (2003). "Sogd under Turkish Rule during VIth-VIIIth centuries (On Sogdian and Turkish Symbiosis)". Transoxiana Journal Libre de Estudios Orientales.
- Yuri Bregel, Historical Atlas of Central Asia, 2003, maps 7 and 8, with text.
- Dobrovits, Mihály (2014–2015). "On the Titulature of Western Turkic Chieftains". Archivum Eurasiae Archivi Aevii. 21. Wiesbaden: Otto-Harassowitz Verlag.
- Tongdian, Vol. 199
- Old Book of Tang, Vol. 194B
- Golden, Peter B., “Oq and Oğur ~ Oğuz”, Turkic Languages, 16/2 (2012). pp. 155–199
- Stark, Sören (2016). "Türgesh Khaganate". Encyclopedia of Empire. Vol. IV. Chichester/Hoboken: Wiley Blackwell.
- Kenzheakhmet, Nurlan (2014). ""Ethnonyms and Toponyms" of the Old Turkic Inscriptions in Chinese sources". Studia et Documenta Turcologica. II: 287–316.
- Kasai, Yukiyo (2014). "The Chinese Phonetic Transcriptions of Old Turkish Words in the Chinese Sources from 6th-9th Century Focused on the Original Word Transcribed as Tujue 突厥". Studies of Inner Asian Languages. 29: 57–135.
- Klyashtorny S.G. (1986). "Genealogiya i khronologiya zapadno-tyurkskikh i tyurgeshskikh kaganov VI–VIII vekov." In Iz istorii dorevolyutsionnogo Kirgizstana. Frunze: Ilim, pp. 164–170.
- Vladimir Tishin (2018). "Kimäk and Chù-mù-kūn (处木昆): Notes on an Identification"
- Yury Zuev. Horse Tamgas from Vassal Princedoms (Translation of Chinese composition "Tanghuiyao" of 8-10th centuries), Kazakh SSR Academy of Sciences, Alma-Ata, 1960, pp. 93–139 (In Russian)
- Yury Zuev, Early Türks: Sketches of history and ideology, Almaty, Daik-Press, 2002 (in Russian)
- Yury Zuev. The strongest tribe, p. 32-61, Almaty, 2004 (in Russian)
