= Tong Yabghu =

Khagan of the Western Turkic Khaganate (618–628)

Qaghan of the Western Turkic Khaganate
- Reign: 618–628
- Predecessor: Shikui Qaghan
- Successor: Baghatur Qaghan
- Died: 628 or 630
Names
- Tong Yabghu Qaghan
- House: Ashina
- Religion: Buddhism

Tong Yabghu Qaghan (Note: also known as T'ung Yabghu and Tong Yabğu, Traditional Chinese: 統葉護可汗, Simplified Chinese: 统叶护可汗, pinyin: Tǒng Yèhù Kěhán, Wade–Giles: T'ung Yeh-hu K'o-han; Middle Chinese: *t'uong d'źiap-ġuo k'â-ġân) (r. 618–628 or 630) was the qaghan of the Western Turkic Khaganate from 618 to 628. Tong Yabghu was the brother of Shikui Khagan (r. 611–618), the previous qaghan of the western Göktürks, and was a member of the Ashina clan; his reign is generally regarded as the zenith of the Western Turkic Khaganate. He is usually identified same as Ziebel, first Qaghan of Khazars.

== Name ==
His name is transcribed with Chinese character 統, which means "main silk thread > guideline, to unite, to command, to govern". Karakhanid scholar Mahmud al-Kashgari, writing in the 11th century, glossed toŋa in Middle Turkic as basically meaning tiger. Gerard Clauson argues against Kashgari and states that toŋa means "hero, outstanding warrior".

== Reign ==
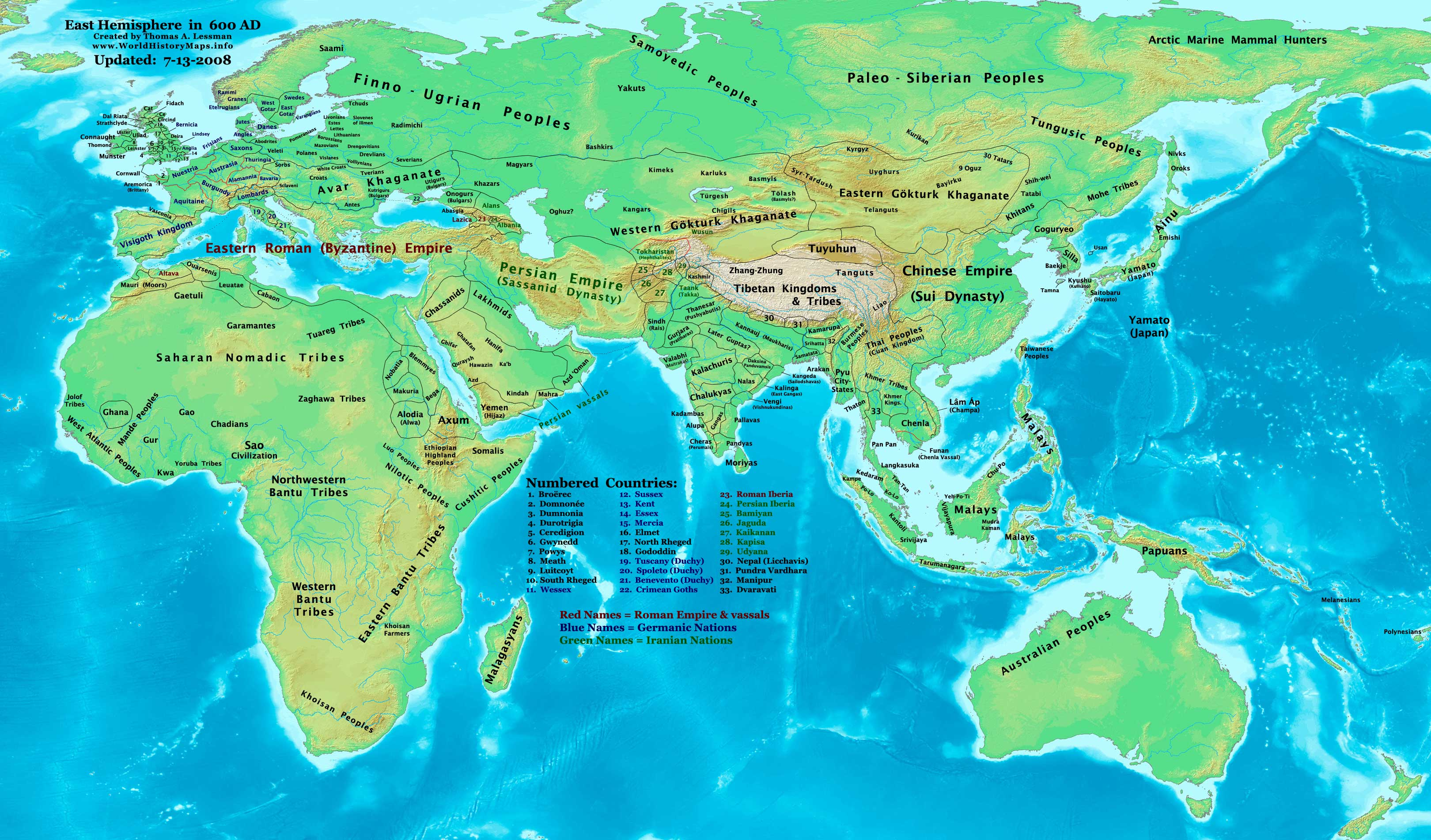
Göktürk khaganates at their height, c. 600

Tong Yabghu maintained close relations with the Tang dynasty of China, and may have married into the imperial family.

The Chinese Buddhist pilgrim Xuanzang visited the western Göktürk capital Suyab in modern Kyrgyzstan and left a description of the Qaghan. Scholars believe the qaghan described by Xuanzang was Tong Yabghu. Gao and La Vaissière argue that the qaghan Xuanzang met was his son Si Yabghu, rather than Tong Yabghu. Xuanzang described the qaghan as follows:

The khan wore a green satin robe; his hair, which was ten feet long, was free. A band of white silk wound round his forehead and hung down behind. The ministers of the presence, numbering two hundred in number, all wearing embroidered robes, stood on his right and left. The rest of his military retinue [was] clothed in fur, serge and fine wool, the spears and standards and bows in order, and the riders of camels and horses stretched far out of [sight].

According to the Old Book of Tang, Tong Yabghu's reign was once considered as the golden age of Western Turkic Khaganate:

Tong Yehu Kaghan is a man of bravery and astuteness. He is good at art of war. Thus he controlled Tiele tribes to the north, confronted Persia to the west, connected with Kasmira (nowadays Kashmir) to the south. All countries are subjected to him. He controlled ten thousands of men with arrow and bow, establishing his power over the western region. He occupied the land of Wusun and moved his tent to Qianquan north of Tashkent. All of the princes of western region assumed the Turk office of Jielifa. Tong Yehu Kaghan also sent a Tutun to monitor them for imposition. The power of Western Turks had never reached such a state before".

== Campaigns against Persia ==
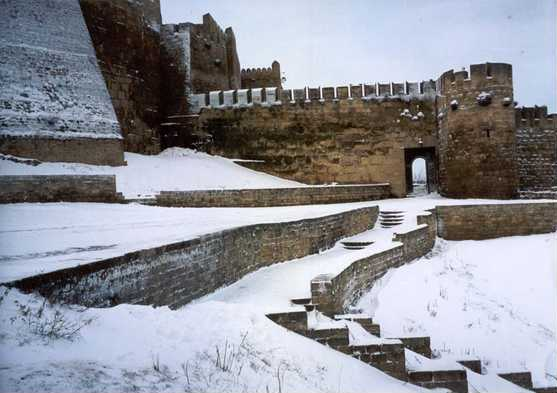
Sassanian fortress in Derbent, built to protect against nomads from the north. Derbent played a vital role in Tong Yabghu's campaigns against Persia.

Tong Yabghu's empire fought with the Sassanids of Iran. In the early 620's his nephew Böri Shad led a series of raids across the Caucasus Mountains into Persian territory. Many scholars have identified Tong Yabghu as the Ziebel mentioned in Byzantine sources as having (as qaghan of the Khazars) campaigned with the Emperor Heraclius in the Caucasus against the Sassanid Persian Empire in 627 and 628. However, the latest research on this topic proves that this is incorrect: if Tong indeed died in 628, Ziebel is to be identified with Sipi qaghan, Tong Yabghu's uncle, who murdered him and rose briefly to the throne. Sipi was by then pronounced Zibil and he was a small qaghan in charge of the western part of Tong Yabghu's empire, exactly as Ziebel was according to the Byzantine sources. Ziebel is described as the brother of Tong in the Byzantine sources, and as his uncle in the Chinese sources, a discrepancy which long precluded the identification. However uncle and elder brother is the same word in ancient Turkish, äçi, and the Chinese sources could not render this double meaning with their very precise system of kinship names. Prior to this some scholars, including Chavannes, Uchida, Gao and Xue Zhongzeng had argued that Tong Yabghu could not be positively identified with Ziebel (or any Khazar ruler) and may actually have died as early as 626. They pointed to discrepancies in the dates between Byzantine and Chinese sources and argued that definitively conflating Ziebel with Tong Yabghu was an exaggeration of the extant evidence.

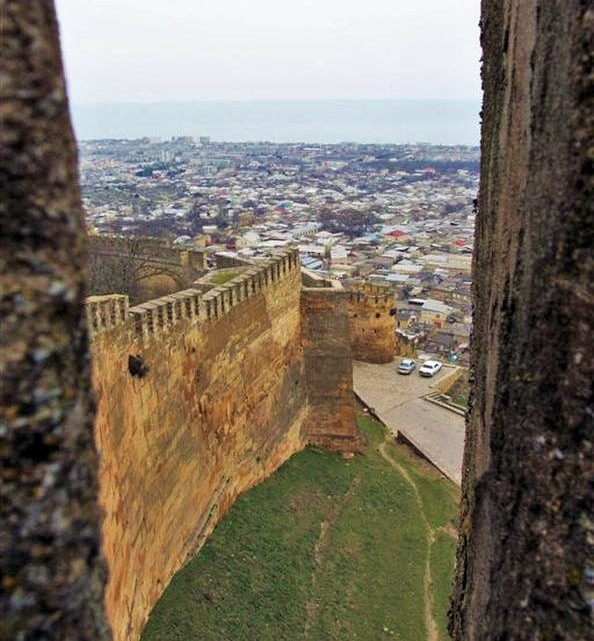
The 20-metre-high Gates of Alexander stretched between the Caspian seashore and the Caucasus for forty kilometers; they are still in existence.

== Annexation of Hephthalite principalities ==
In c. 625, Tong Yabgu Khagan started subjugating the Hephthalite principalities, which included Tokharistan, Gandhara, Tarim Basin, Ferghana, and Bactria. (Note: "The definitive annexation of Tokharistan and Gandhara to the Western Türk Empire was to take place some years later, in c. 625..") After reaching the Indus valley, Tong Yabgu appointed Turkic rulers in place of the Hephthalite dynasties.

== Governance ==
Tong Yabghu appointed governors or tuduns to manage the various tribes and people under his overlordship. In all likelihood Tong Yabghu's nephew Böri Shad, and son of Zibil/Ziebel was the commander of the Khazars, the westernmost of the tribes owing allegiance to the Western Göktürks; this branch of the family may have provided the khazars with their first qaghans in the mid seventh century.

Tong Yaghbu also supported the spread of Buddhism within his realm and patronised scholars from the monastery of Nalanda in India including the translator and monk, Prabhakāramitra.

== Death ==
In c. 628 or 630 he was murdered by Külüg Sibir, his uncle and a partisan of the Dulu faction. Following the death of Tong Yabghu, the might of the Western Göktürks largely collapsed. Although the khaganate lingered for a few decades before falling to the Chinese Empire, many of the client tribes became independent and a number of successor states, including the Khazar Khaganate and Great Bulgaria, became independent.

== Family ==
He had at least 2 sons:

- Sy Yabghu Qaghan
- Tardush Shad (達頭设) - Yabgu of Tokharistan

== Bibliography ==
- Artamonov, Mikhail. Istoriya Khazar. Leningrad, 1962.
- Bálint, Csanád (2000). Kontakte zwischen Iran, Byzanz und der Steppe im 6.-7. Jahrhundert. Publicationes Instituti Archaeologici Academiae Scientiarum Hungaricae. ISBN 9789637391811.
- Brook, Kevin Alan. The Jews of Khazaria. 3rd ed. Rowman & Littlefield Publishers, Inc, 2018. ISBN 978-1-5381-0342-5
- Christian, David. A History of Russia, Mongolia and Central Asia. Blackwell, 1999.
- Gao Lei. "Revision of Zhongguo Lishi Da Cidian's Sui Tang Wudai Juan (Comprehensive Dictionary of Chinese History, vol. Sui, Tang and Five Dynasties)". Journal of Yantai Normal Institute's Philosophy & Social Sciences, 2001.
- Dani, Ahmad Hasan; Litvinsky, B. A., eds. (1996). History of Civilizations of Central Asia: The crossroads of civilizations, A.D. 250 to 750. UNESCO. ISBN 978-92-3-103211-0.
- Gibbon, Edward. The History of the Decline and Fall of the Roman Empire. London, 1845.
- Golden, Peter Benjamin. Introduction to the History of the Turkic Peoples. Wiesbaden: Harrasowitz, 1992.
- Golden, Peter Benjamin. Khazar Studies: An Historio-Philological Inquiry into the Origins of the Khazars. Budapest: Akadémiai Kiadó, 1980.
- Golden, Peter Benjamin. Nomads and Sedentary Societies in Medieval Eurasia. Washington, D.C.: American Historical Society, 1998.
- Klyashtorny, S.G. and T.I. Sultanov. Kazakhstan. Alma-Ata, 1992.
- La Vaissière, E. de "Notes sur la chronologie de Xuanzang" Journal Asiatique 298.1 2010 pp. 157–168.
- La Vaissière, E. de "Oncles et frères : les qaghans Ashinas et le vocabulaire turc de la parenté" Turcica 42, 2010, p. 267–277
- La Vaissière, E. de "Ziebel Qaghan identified" in C. Zuckerman (ed.), Constructing the 7th century (Travaux et mémoires 17), Paris 2013, pp. 741–748
- Lee, Joo-Yup (2023). The Turkic Peoples in World History. Taylor & Francis. ISBN 9781000904215.
- Mango, C. & R. Scott (trans.), The Chronicle of Theophanes Confessor, Oxford University Press, 1997.
- Movses Kagankatvatsi. История агван Моисея Каганкатваци, писателя X века (trans. and ed. by Patkanov). St. Petersburg, 1861.
- Stewart, Peter; Rienjang, Wannaporn, eds. (2020). The Global Connections of Gandhāran Art. Archaeopress Publishing Limited. ISBN 9781789696967.
- Xue, Zongzheng. A History of Turks. Beijing: Chinese Social Sciences Press, 1992. ISBN 7-5004-0432-8

Tong Yabghu Ashina Clan
Preceded by Shikui Qaghan	Qaghan of the Western Turkic Khaganate; 618–628	Succeeded by Baghatur Qaghan
