= Göktürk civil war =

Civil War in the Göktürk Empire

Göktürk civil war

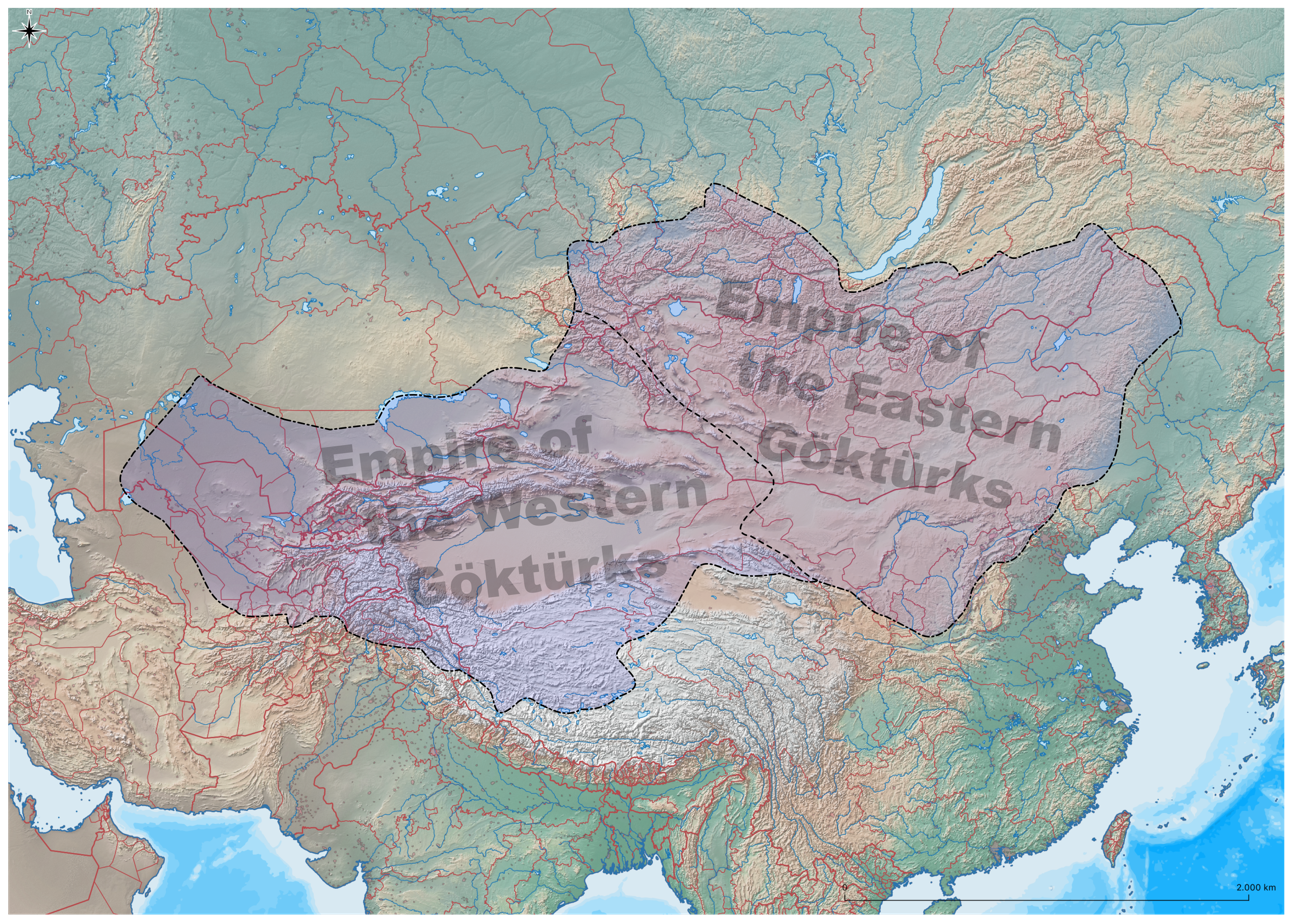
The khaganate in 552

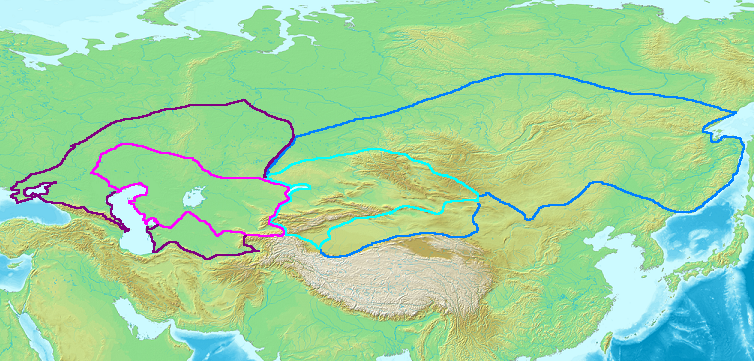
Gokturk khaganates at their height, c. 600 AD:
Western Gokturk: Lighter area is direct rule, darker areas show sphere of influence.
Eastern Gokturk: Lighter area is direct rule, darker areas show sphere of influence.

The Göktürk civil war or Turkic interregnum was a number of political crises in the Turkic Khaganate first between 583 and 603, which resulted the khaganate being split into Western and Eastern parts.

== Background ==
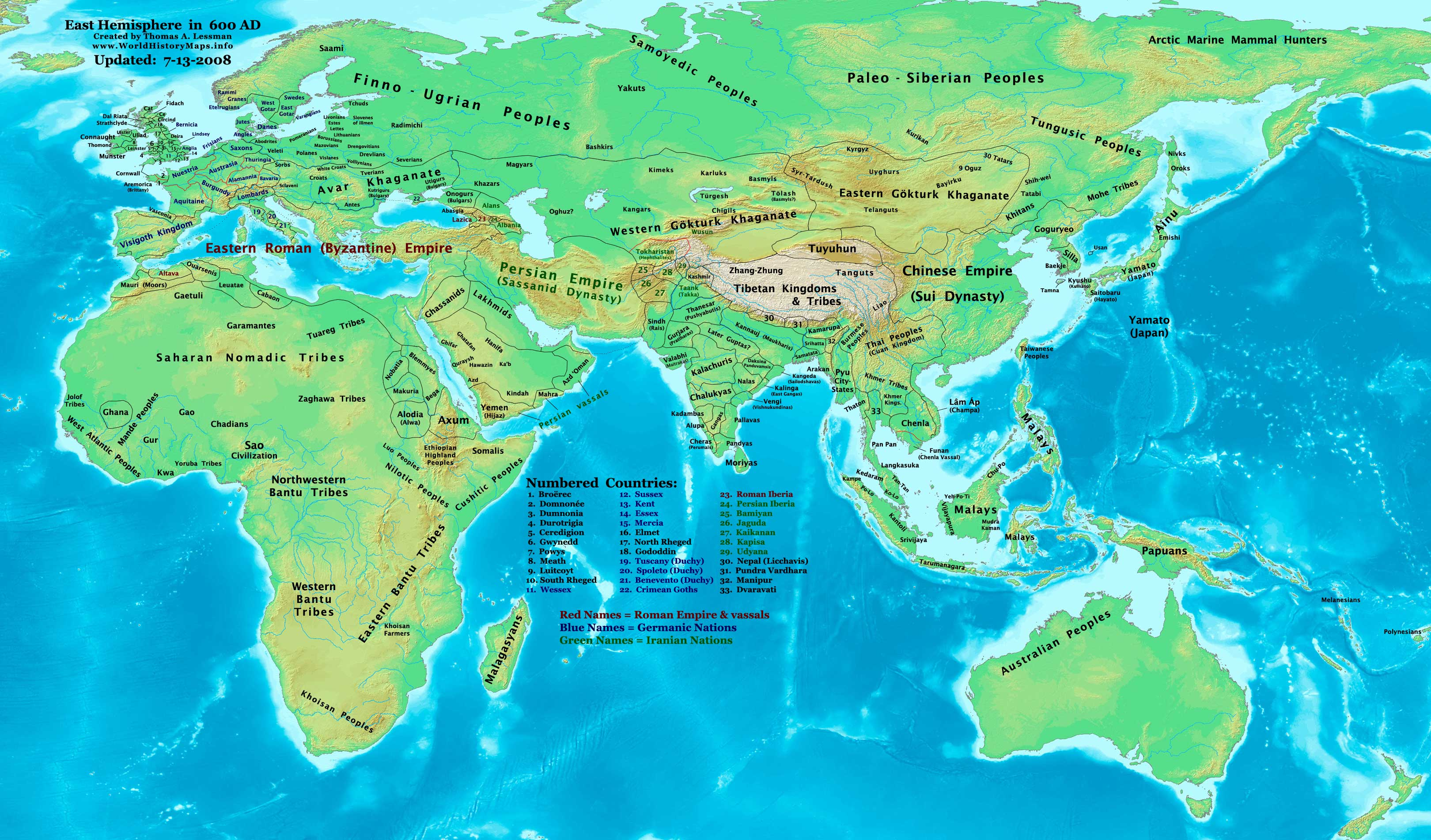
Western and Eastern Turkic Khaganates in 600 AD

The Turkic Khaganate was an empire stretching from Manchuria to the Black Sea. The name of the ruling clan was Ashina. The khagans were appointed by the kurultay (council of tribe leaders), normally from the sons, brothers and nephews of the last ruler.

== Beginning of the interregnum ==
In 581, the fourth khagan, Taspar Qaghan, died. There were four claimants to the throne.

	father, grandfather	Regnal name (Chinese reading)	Personal name (Chinese reading)	Regnal name (Turkic reading by Gumilev)	Personal name (Turkic reading by Gumilev)
Amrak Khagan	Taspar, Bumin	Di-er ke-han	An-luo	N/A	Амрак (Amrak)
Apa Qaghan	Muqan, Bumin	A-po K'o-han	Ta-lo-pien	Апа-хан (Apa-khan)	Торэмен (Töremen)
Ishbara Qaghan	Issik, Bumin	Sha-po-lüeh K'o-han,	She-t'u	Бага Ышбара-хан (Bağa Işbara-han)	Иль-кюлюг шад (İl-külüg şad)
Tardu	Istämi, Ashina Tuwu	Ta-t'ou K'o-han	Tien-chüeh	Тардуш-хан, Боке-хан (Tardu-khan, Böke-khan)	Кара-Чурин Тюрк (Kara-Çürin Türk)

Bumin Qaghan had founded the dynasty and was followed in succession by his three sons: Issik, Muqan and Taspar. Prince Anluo (Amrak Khagan) was Taspar Qaghan's son, Talopien (Apa Qaghan) and Shetu (Ishbara Qaghan) were Taspar's nephews, while Tien-chueh (Tardu) was Taspar's cousin.

Before dying, Taspar Qaghan had announced his preference for Talopien to succeed him instead of his son Anluo, although he had no right to determine the succession. During the kurultay after Taspar's death, Ishbara (then called Shetu), who was also a claimant, saw that he had no chance and supported the pacifist Anluo against Apa on the ground that Apa's mother was not of noble birth. He threatened the kurultay that in case of Apa's election he would revolt. Thus the kurultay appointed Anluo as the new khan. However Anluo's regency was short-lived because of the reaction of Apa's partisans. Anluo quickly renounced the title on behalf of his powerful ally Ishbara who became the khan with the regnal name Ishbara Qaghan.

== Partition ==
Ishbara Qaghan held the center, residing in the holy forest Ötüken in modern-day central Mongolia. Tardu held the far west in what was becoming the Western Turkic Khaganate. Anluo controlled the region around the Tuul River near Ulaanbaatar. Apa Qaghan, was sovereign in the northern territories.

== Civil war ==
In 584, Ishbara Qaghan raided Apa Qaghan's territory and killed the Apa Qaghan's mother. Apa Qaghan took refuge in the west and allied himself with its powerful ruler Tardu. Both Tardu and his brother Tamgan (Turksanf), the ruler of the Volga river area, supplied him with troops. Ishbara Qaghan wasn't able to compete with this force, and accepted the suzerainty of the Sui dynasty to protect himself. With Sui support he was able to capture Apa Qaghan's family members. Apa Qaghan once again escaped west and settled in the Poykent near Bukhara (in modern Uzbekistan). However, in his new territory, the former alliance broke and he lost the support of Tardu because of the disagreement over the control of the Silk Road. In 587, both Ishbara Qaghan and Apa Qaghan died.

== Aftermath ==
After Ishbara and Apa died the east was held by Ishbara's brother Bagha Qaghan (587–589) and Ishbara's son Tulan Qaghan (589–599), while the west remained under Tardu (587–603). After Tulan's death Tardu briefly reunified the east and west, but after 603 the two halves were separated again.

== End of the first khaganate ==
There was a power vacuum between 630 and 682 after the Eastern Khaganate was conquered in 630 and the Western Khaganate in 657 by the Tang dynasty. Although Ashina Jiesheshuai tried to restore the Turkic Khaganate in 639, and Ashina Funian in 681 they both failed. In 645, Chebi Khan restored Turkic Khaganate from 645 until 650. It was subsequently annexed by the Tang. In 682 the Göktürks regained their independence and established the Second Turkic Khaganate. Ashina Qutlugh was enthroned with the title Ilterish Qaghan.

== See also ==
- Göktürk Kaghans
- Timeline of the Turks (500–1300)
- Uyghur timeline
