= Timeline of the Turkic peoples (500–1300) =

Below is the identified timeline of the history of the Turkic peoples between the 6th and 14th centuries.

== 6th century ==
Year	Event
545	A Western Wei envoy to the Altai Mountains. First mention of Bumin, as the leader of the Ashina tribe, the rulers of the Göktürks).
551	Bumin declares independence of the Turks around the Altai Mountains, conquers Ötüken in Mongolian Plateau and takes the title khagan (qaghan). His empire is known as First Turkic Khaganate.
552	Shortly after sending his brother Istämi to the Western Regions as his yabghu (vassal), Bumin Qaghan dies. His elder son Issik Qaghan (Keluo) becomes qaghan.
554	Bumin's second son Muqan Qaghan becomes qaghan. After a series of successful campaigns, the Göktürks began to control the Silk Road.
568	An alliance with the Byzantine Empire under Justin II is formed after a delegation of the Turks led by Sogdian Maniah arrive in Constantinople to trade silk with the Byzantines.
572	Taspar Qaghan, the youngest son of Bumin becomes the khagan after the death of his brother.
576	The alliance with the Byzantines ceases after the Byzantines (contrary to their agreement) accept a treaty with Avars, enemies of the Göktürks. The Göktürks seize a Byzantine stronghold in the Crimea.
580	Agathias included within Hunnic circle these tribes: the Vurugunds, (Note: Βουρούγουνδοι. Otto J. Maenchen-Helfen rejects attempts to identify them with the Germanic tribe Burgundi.) Ultizurs, as well as the Turkic tribes Cotrigurs and Utigurs.
581	Tardush, the second yabgu in the west, lay siege to Tauric Chersonesus in Crimea.
581	Two rival states in China begin to pay annual tribute to the Turkic Khaganate.
584	Taspar Qaghan dies, civil war breaks out. (Ishbara Qaghan vs. Apa Qaghan) Tardush interferes.
587	Tardush de facto ruler of the west. Period of dual khaganates. From now on the west khaganate is also called Onok.
588	Perso-Turkic war of 588–589. An attempt of the Turkic Khaganate to invade Afghanistan. But Bahram Chobin of Persia defeats the Turkic Khaganate.
593	End of Turkic interregnum.

== 7th century ==
Year	Event
609	Shibi Khan becomes the khagan of the Eastern Turkic Khaganate.
615	Shibi Khan's advisor is executed by Pei Ju at a negotiation in Mayi; the khan retaliates by invading Yanmen Commandery during a visit there by Emperor Yang, besieging him and his court at the commandery seat (present-day Daixian, Shanxi). He lifts the siege following a false report from his wife, the Sui princess Yicheng, that the khaganate is under attack from the north.
618	Tong Yabghu Qaghan becomes the khagan of the Western Turkic Khaganate. According to some accounts he is also known as Ziebel the founder of Khazar state (or Khazaria) in Caucasus as a part of Onok.
619	Hephthalites/Gokturk raids of 614-616. Tong Yabghu Qaghan raids as far as to Isfahan; but is repelled.
625	Alliance with the Byzantine Empire under Heraclius when the emperor requests military aid from the Turks under Tong Yabghu.
626	Illig Qaghan takes advantage of the Incident at Xuanwu Gate and charges to Wei River.
627	Perso-Turkic war of 627–629. Böri Shad conquers Derbend in Caucasus and raids Azerbaijan.
628	Xueyantuo (under the command of Yi'nan) and Toquz Oghuz defeats Yukuk Shad (shad of northern side) and Ashina She'er (shad of western side) of the Eastern Turkic Khaganate.
630	Tang China supports a revolt of vassals of eastern khaganate. Tang army under the command of Li Jing defeats the Eastern Turkic Khaganate at Battle of Yinshan. Emperor Taizong says It's enough for me to compensate my dishonor at Wei River (626). East khaganate becomes vassal of China.
632	Kubrat unified and ruled Old Great Bulgaria.
638	The two wings of the Western Turkic Kaganate (Nushibi and Tulo) split, with the Ili river as the boundary.
639	Ashina Jiesheshuai's unsuccessful raid against Jiucheng Palace.
640	Yukuk Shad tries to unite the Onok tribes, but soon escapes to Kunduz in Afghanistan.
642	Western Turkic soldiers retreat from Gaochang and the kingdom is captured by Tang dynasty forces. Military conflicts against the Tang dynasty continue for the next few decades.
644	Western Turks defeated in a battle against the Tang dynasty in Karasahr.
648	Western Turks lose a battle against the Tang dynasty in Kucha.
650	Khazars defeat Abd ar-Rahman ibn Rabiah of Rashidun Arabs in Caucasus.
657	China dispatches a military campaign that defeats the western khaganate. Western khaganate becomes vassal of China. During power vacuum, Turgesh tribe emerges as the leading power of Onok.
664	Peace treaty between Caucasian Albania King Javanshir (636-669) and Caucasian Huns Elteber Alp Ilitver with conditions of dynastic marriage union, Huns' takeover of all Albanian fortresses, annual tribute to the Huns, and Huns obligation to defend Albania from Arab aggression.
679	Ashide Wenfu and Ashide Fengzhi who were Turkic leaders of Danyu Da Douhufu made Ashina Nishu Beg a Turkic qaghan and revolts against Tang dynasty.
680	Pei Xingjian defeated Ashina Nishu Beg and his army. Ashina Nishu Beg was killed by his men.
680	Ashide Wenfu made Ashina Funian a qaghan and revolted against Tang dynasty.
681	Ashide Wenfu and Ashina Funian surrendered to Pei Xingjian. 54 Turks (including Ashide Wenfu, Ashina Funian) were publicly executed in the Eastern Market of Chang'an.
681	Ashina Kutlug revolts with the remnants of Ashina Funian's men.
682	Ashina Kutlug becomes Ilterish Qaghan and establishes the Second Eastern Turkic Khaganate.
685	Ilterish Qaghan defeats the Chinese in Hin Chu.
693	Barsbek proclaims the creation of the Kyrgyz Khaganate.
694	Death of Ilterish Qaghan. Qapaghan Qaghan becomes the second khagan.
695	Qapagan recognises Barsbek as the Khagan of the Kyrgyz.
698	Qapagan annexes Turkestan (On Oq territory). against Turgesh.

== 8th century ==
Year	Event
704	Umayyad governor Qutayba ibn Muslim invades Transoxiana.
710	Second Turkic Khaganate inflicted a crushing defeat on the Kyrgyz Khaganate. Barsbek, Khagan of the Kyrgyz, fell in battle, and his descendants were to remain vassals of the Göktürks for several generations.
711	in the Battle of Bolchu, Turkic army defeats Turgesh.
713	Turco-Arab wars in Transoxiana. Arab victory leads to shift of power in Turkestan from Turkic Khaganate to their Turgesh vassals again.
716	First treaty with known terms between Byzantine Emperor Theodosios III and Danube Bulgaria Khan Tervel delineating borders, fixing the size of Byzantine annual tribute to the Khan at 30 lb. of gold, exchange of prisoners, return of refugees, and unimpeded trade between the two countries
716	Qapaghan Qaghan was killed in his campaign against Toquz Oghuz and his head was sent to Changan. Kul Tigin carried out a coup d'état. They killed Qapaghan's son and brothers and made Bilge Qaghan a Kaghan.
716 (?)	The first written records in Old Turkic language. Bain Tsokto inscriptions of Tonyukuk. (These monuments have been erected by himself, a few years before his death.)
717	Inel Qaghan gets overthrown by Kul Tigin. Bilge Kaghan ascends to the throne.
717	Suluk becomes Turgesh Khaghan.
718	A short period of stability in Turkic Empire. Bilge and his triumvirate (Kültiğin and Tonyukuk) suppress all revolts.
723	Governor al-Harashi of Umayyad Arabs massacres Turks and Sogdian refugees for the second time in Khujand
724	Turgesh Kaghan Suluk defeats superior Umayyad Arab armies by his hit and run tactics so called "The Day of Thirst" (Yawm al-'Atash)
728	Turgesh Qaghan Suluk defeats Umayyad Arab armies for the second time.
730 (?)	Khazars defeat Umayyad Arab armies in southern Caucasus. But victorious Qaghan Barjik dies in the battle.
734	Death of Bilge Khagan.
735	Khöshöö Tsaidam Monuments of Bilge Khagan and his brother Kül Tigin. (Bilge has already erected Kül Tigin's monument and Bilge's son erects Bilge's monument.) Together with Bain Tsokto monument of Tonyukuk, these monuments are called Orkhon monuments. (In 2004 the monuments are included in List of World Heritage Sites in Asia and Australasia)
737	Umayyad Arabs defeat Khazars and capture Khazar capital Balanjar. Khazars soon after drive Arabs back. But the capital is shifted to Atil.
738	Suluk is assassinated.
740	Khazar khan Bulan embraces Judaism. But the subjects are free to choose their religion.
744	Turkic subjects like Basmyl, Uyghur and Karluk who are not the members of Ashina clan stage a coup. End of Ashina clan. (except in Khazaria)
744	First Uyghur khan Kutluk Bilge. Uyghurs replace Turkic Khaganate in the east and their vassal Karluks begin to conquer the former Onoq territory in the west.
747	Second Uyghur khan Bayanchur Khan who begins the construction of a big capital city Ordu Baliq
750	Arab empire Umayyad dynasty ends. Abbasid policy more tolerant to Turks.
751	Arabs defeat Chinese in the Battle of Talas during which 20,000 Karluk mercenaries switch to the Arab side in the middle of the battle.
753	Tariat inscriptions of Bayanchor Khan of Uyghurs. (probable date)
755	After the battle of Talas civil war in China. Bayanchor supports Chinese emperor against rebellious general An Lushan.
756	Peace treaty between Byzantine Emperor Constantine V and Danube Bulgaria Khan Kormisosh ending long period of military conflict
765	Third Uyghur khan Bogu embraces Manicheism.
766	Karluks defeat Turgesh. Most of Turkestan (former Onak territory) under Karluk rule. But in the west of Lake Aral a loose confederation named Oghuz Yabgu State emerges.
789	Ediz house replaces Yaglakar house in Uyghur Khaganate.

== 9th century ==
Year	Event
815	Thirty Years’ Peace Treaty of 815 was signed in Constantinople between the Bulgarian khan Omurtag and the Byzantine Emperor Leo V the Armenian about 30-years peace.
820	Kyrgyz start war with Uyghurs.
821	Uyghurs repulse Tibetans.
836	The capital of the caliphate (Arabian empire) is moved from Baghdad to the new city of Samarra by Caliph Al-Mu'tasim because of unrest caused by Turkic slave soldiers (named Mameluk). (Mameluk practice has begun shortly after Battle of Talas)
840	Kyrgyz (north) defeat Uyghurs. Re-establishment of the Kyrgyz Khaganate. Supported by Uyghur refugees, Karluks establish the state of Karakhanids in Transoxiana.
848	Some Uyghur refugees establish a small state in Gansu, north China.
856	A third group of Uyghur refugees establish another state in Turpan, present day Xinjiang, west China.
868	Ahmad ibn Tulun, a Turkic mameluk general in Arab army founds Tulunid dynasty in Egypt.
881	Three Khazar tribes collectively named Kabar diverge from the main body and move westwards together with the seven tribes of Magyars.
892	Khazars force Pechenegs to west who in turn force Magyars to Hungary.
898	Treaty of 898 between the Bulgarian Tsar Simeon and the Byzantine Emperor Leo Choerosphactus after a devastating unprovoked war on Bulgaria from two sides and final Bulgarian victory resumes Byzantine payment of annual tribute to Danube Bulgaria

== 10th century ==
Year	Event
914	Treaty of 914 was a peace treaty concluded between Pechenegs and a prince of Rus principality Igor.
924	Mongols of Khitan drive Kyrgyz out of Mongolia. Some Kyrgyz return to Yenisei region and some flee to present-day Kyrgyzstan.
932	Saltuk Buğra Khan of Karakhanids convert to Islam, making him the first Turkic monarch to do so.
940	Byzantine-Kievan Rus' alliance against Khazars. Khazar Khanate loses Crimea.
941	Gansu state (Sari Uyghurs) becomes vassal of China.
960	Khazar Correspondence between Hasdai ibn Shaprut (of Córdoba) and Khagan Joseph of Khazars.
963	Alp Tigin, a Turkic general, establishes Ghaznavids as a vassal state of Samanids
969	Rus capture Khazar capital Atil.
977	Under Sebük Tekin Ghaznavids become a Muslim sultanate (empire).
985	A big Turkic tribe (Kinik) under the leadership of Seljuk migrates from Khazar (Oguz?) territory to suburbs of the city Jend (which is now in South Kazakhstan).
999	Dissolution of Oguz confederation by Kipchaks.

== 11th century ==
Year	Event
1016	Khazar Kaganate dissolves under pressure from Rus and Kipchaks.
1037	Rus defeat Pechenegs.
1038	Seljuk's grandsons Tugrul and Chaghri conquer the historical city of Merv in present-day Turkmenistan and declare independence. Beginning of the Great Seljuk Empire.
1040	Tugrul and Chagri of Seljuk Turks defeat a Ghaznavid army at the battle of Dandanaqan and begin to settle in eastern Persia.
1042	Civil war in Karakhanid territory. East and west Karakhanids.
1048	Ibrahim Yinal (Tugrul's uterine brother) of Seljuk Turks defeat a Byzantine-Georgian army at Battle of Pasinler (also called battle of Kapetrou). Turks in East Anatolia.
1050	Pechenegs raid Byzantine territories.
1055	After a series of victories Tughrul is declared sultan (of Great Seljuk Sultanate) by the caliph.
1065	Uzes paid hommage to Byzantine Empire
1071	Alp Arslan of Seljuk Turks defeat Romanos Diogenes of Byzantine in the battle of Manzikert.
1072	Death of Alp Arslan. Malik Shah becomes the sultan.
1072	Danishmend Gazi who is the hero of epic tales Danishmendname founds a principality around Sivas, central Anatolia (i.e., Asiatic side of present Turkey).
1072	Dīwān Lughāt al-Turk was written by Mahmud al-Kashgari of Karakhanids to be presented to Abbasid Caliphate.
1077	Süleyman I (a cousin of Melik Shah) founds a state in what is now west Turkey. Although a vassal of Great Seljuk Empire it soon becomes totally independent. (Seljuks of Rum, Seljuk Sultanate of Rum, Sultanate of Rum, Seljuks of Turkey, Seljuks of Anatolia, Sultanate of Iconium are among the many names used for this state)
1077	Emergence of Khwarezm dynasty as a vassal of Great Seljuk Empire.
1081	Tzachas of Smyrna founds a beylik (principality) in İzmir, Western Anatolia and emerges as the first sea power in Turkish history.
1085	Tutush I, Malik Shah's brother founds a short lived principality in Syria.
1089	Hungarians defeat the Kipchaks.
1091	Kipchacks defeat the Pechenegs.
1093	Kipchacks defeat Sviatopolk II of Kievan Rus' in the Battle of the Stugna River,
1096	Kılıç Arslan I of Seljuks defeats People's Crusade.
1097	During First Crusade Crusades defeat Seljuks at the Battle of Dorylaeum. Capital İznik captured by Crusades (New capital Konya)

== 12th century ==
Year	Event
1101	Kılıç Arslan I of the Seljuk Sultanate of Rûm defeats Stephen of Blois and Hugh of Vermandois, of the second wave of First Crusades.
1104	Tuğtekin, atabeg of Damascus founds a short lived principality in Syria. First example of a series of Seljukid atabeg dynasties.
1121	A Seljuq army led by the Artuqid Ilghazi of Mardin is defeated by the Georgians near Tiflis.
1128	Zangi, atabeg of Mosul and Aleppo founds Zengid dynasty.
1141	Mongols of Khitan defeat Great Seljuk Sultan Sanjar in the Battle of Qatwan.
1146	Ildeniz, atabeg of Azerbaijan founds a dynasty, being the first independent Turkic dynasty of Azerbaijan.
1147	During Second Crusade, Mesud I of Seljuk Sultanate of Rûm defeats Holy Roman Emperor Conrad III in the second battle of Dorylaeum and French king Louis VII at battle of Laodicea.
1153	Great Seljuk sultan Sanjar is defeated by his Oguz vassals.
1154	Oghuz Turks destroy Library of Nishapur
1176	Kılıç Arslan II of Seljuks defeats Manuel I Komnenos of Byzantine Empire in the battle of Myriokephalon.
1178	End of Danishmends. Their territory is annexed by Kılıç Arslan II.
1190	German Holy Roman emperor Frederick I Barbarossa and a contingent of the Third Crusade defeat the Turks at the Battle of Konya (Iconium) in Southern Anatolia. He subsequently drowns whilst crossing the Göksu River, near Silifke.

== 13th century ==
Year	Event
1202	Suleiman II of Rum defeats Saltukids and annexes northeastern Anatolia.
1205	After the disintegration of the Seljuk Empire, the Khwarazmshahs declare independence and conquered most of the former Seljuk territory.
1206	Mamluk dynasty of Delhi established by Qutb ud-Din Aibak in India.
1209	Uyghurs of Turpan become vassals of the Mongols.
1209	Birth of Nasreddin, a satirical Sufi figure in Akşehir, Western Anatolia. His anecdotes and jokes, especially those involving Mongol overlords after 1243, are always very popular in all Turkic-speaking countries.
1211	Mongolic Khitans end the eastern part of the Kara-Khanid Khanate.
1212	Khwarazmshahs end the remaining Kara-Khanid Khanate.
1220	Kayqubad I becomes Sultan of Rum.
1220	Mongols end Khwarezm Shāh.
1224	The Qarlughids of Bamyan and Kurraman establish their kingdom.
1230	Alaaddin Keykubat I of Seljuks defeats Jalal al-Din Mangburni in the Battle of Yassıçemen
1236	Razia Sultana of the Delhi Sultanate the first known female ruler in Islamic countries.
1239	Revolt of Baba Ishak. A revolt of Oghuz Turks and refugees from Khwarezm recently arrived in Anatolia. The revolt is bloodily suppressed, but the Sultanate loses power.
1241	Mongol Empire defeats Kipchaks.
1243	Mongol Empire defeats the Seljuk Sultanate of Rum in the Battle of Köse Dağ.
1250	Aybak, a member of a caste of Kipchak soldiers, establishes the Mamluk Sultanate in Egypt
1255	Karaman beylik founded by Karim al-Din Karaman.
1260	Mameluk general Baybars defeats the Ilkhanate leader Hulegu Khan in the Battle of Ayn Jalut.
1277	the Firman of Karamanoğlu Mehmet Bey, declares 'Turkish' as the official language of the Karamanids rather than New Persian.
1293	Another Kyrgyz uprising is defeated by the Mongols. Most Kyrgyz tribes migrate to present-day Kyrgyzstan.
1293	Codex Cumanicus: A Kipchak dictionary written for Latins.
1299	Ottoman beylik founded by Osman I.

== See also ==
- Oghuz Turks
- Nomadic empire
- Göktürk family tree
