= Mughan (disambiguation) =

Mughan plain (Azerbaijani: Muğan düzü, مغان دوزو; Persian: دشت مغان, romanized: Dasht-i Mughān) is a plain in northwestern Iran and the southern part of the Republic of Azerbaijan.

Mughan or Muğan (Azerbaijani: Muğan, مغان; Persian: مغان, romanized: Mughān) may also refer to:

== Places ==
- Mughan Mahal, historical administrative territory, now in Azerbaijan and Iran
- Mughan Ganjali
- Mughan, Bilasuvar
- Mughan, Hajigabul
- Mughan, Jalilabad
- Mughan, Iran
- Mughan (province), a province of the Abbasid Caliphate, in present-day Iranian Azerbaijan
- Mughan, former name of Hovtamej, Armenia

== Other ==
- Mughan clashes
- Mughan culture
- Mughan FK
- Mughan Soviet Republic
- Mugan (disambiguation)
