= Tamgan =

Turk Shad
- Tamghan Tegin Turk Shad
- House: Ashina
- Father: Istemi Yabgu
- Religion: Tengrism

Tumgan (also known as Turkshad, Turxanthos) was a shad (governor prince) of the First Turkic Khaganate in the late 6th century. According to Edward Gibbon his name may be a title rather than a proper name.

== Background ==
In 552 Bumin Qaghan founded the First Turkic Khaganate. His younger brother Istämi was viceroy (yabghu) in the west. In 575 Istämi was succeeded by Tardu. By 575/576 Tamgan held some kind of power in the far west around the Volga River. He was probably Tardu's younger brother.

== Relations with the Byzantine Empire ==
Because of the geographic position of his region, Tamgan was responsible for diplomatic relations with Byzantine Empire (Hence, the historical sources about Tamgan are mostly the reports of Byzantine envoys). Initially Turkic and Byzantine Empires were allies against Sassanid Iran and the Pannonian Avars. However, according to Byzantine historian Menander Protector, a Byzantine envoy named Valentinos visited Tamgan's headquarters where Tamgan accused Byzantines for the recently signed treaty between the Byzantine Empire and the Avars. He said that the Byzantines were liars and had ten tongues, meaning they were unreliable as allies. He also threatened the Byzantines, mentioning the rivers Danapr, Istr and Evr (former names of Dnieper, Danube and Maritsa). Following this accusation, the Turks began capturing Byzantine possessions around the northeast Black Sea coasts and Crimea. Briefly, a part of the Bosporan Kingdom in Crimea, a vassal of Byzantine Empire fell to the Turks. Tardu effectively fought in this area, but left his gains to Tamgan.

== Death ==
There is no record of Tamgan's death. However it is known that together with his brother he supported Apa Qaghan during the Göktürk civil war after 584.
