= Amrak Khagan =

Ashina Anluo

Qaghan of the First Turkic Khaganate
- Reign: 581
- Predecessor: Taspar Qaghan
- Successor: Apa Qaghan (in Bukhara); Ishbara Qaghan (in East); Tardu Qaghan (in West)
- House: Ashina
- Dynasty: First Turkic Khaganate
- Father: Taspar Qaghan
- Religion: Tengrism

Amrak Khagan or Ashina Anluo (Chinese: 阿史那菴羅 or 阿史那庵羅) was the fifth ruler of the First Turkic Khaganate who reigned during the sixth century. His regnal title is not recorded in Chinese sources.

== Name ==
His name is subject to debate. The Book of Sui and Tongdian recorded his name as Ānluó (Chinese: 菴羅) whereas the Zizhi Tongjian recorded similarly sounding version Ānluó (Chinese: 庵羅). The Cefu Yuangui has both versions. Lev Gumilev proposed Amraq (Old Turkic: 𐰢𐰺𐰴, lit. 'Beloved') as a Turkic reconstruction of Anluo. His name was recorded in the Bugut inscription in Sogdian: 𐼍𐼄𐼁 𐼇𐼍𐼎𐼁 𐼉𐼒𐼄𐼒𐼎,, romanized: Maġa Umna Khagan. Turkish scholar Hayrettin İhsan Erkoç proposed Umna as a proper reconstruction.

== Reign ==
According to Chinese sources Amrak Khagan was enthroned after his father Taspar Qaghan's death in 581, soon his cousin Talopien (Muqan Qaghan's son) proposed his own claim, saying that Taspar willed the title to him. Just like how Taspar inherited this title from his father. Chinese sources suggest that Amrak's mother was a noble while Talopien's mother was a commoner, hence he wasn't favorable. Another cousin Shetu (Issik Qaghan's son) supported Anluo, threatening to rebel if the throne was passed to Talopien. Meanwhile, Talopien still harassed Amrak and sent a few emissaries to force him to abdicate. Amrak, being the least powerful of the three abandoned and renounced his title in favor of Shetu. In turn Shetu made him Dier Khagan (Chinese: 第二可汗; pinyin: Dìèr Kèhán) in the Tuul River valley (now in Mongolia).

Amrak Khagan Ashina Clan
Preceded by Taspar Khagan	Khagan of the Turkic Khaganate; 581–582 (?)	Succeeded by Ishbara Khagan
