= Illig Qaghan (disambiguation) =

Illig Qaghan may refer to:

- Illig Qaghan, one of the qaghans of the Eastern Turkic Khaganate.
- Bumin Qaghan, founder of the First Turkic Khaganate.
