= Murad Mirzayev =

Azerbaijani military officer (1976–2016)

- Murad Mirzəyev
- Born: 31 March 1976; Muğan Gəncəli, Sabirabad District, Azerbaijan SSR
- Died: 3 April 2016 (aged 40) near Talysh village, Nagorno Karabakh
- Military career
- Allegiance: Azerbaijan
- Branch: Special Forces of Azerbaijan
- Service years: 1998–2016
- Rank: Lieutenant colonel
- Conflicts: 2016 Armenian–Azerbaijani clashes
- Awards: National Hero of Azerbaijan, "For Faultless Service" medal (3rd and 2nd degrees), "For distinction in military service" medal (3rd and 2nd degrees), The tenth Anniversary of the Armed Forces of the Azerbaijani Republic 1991–2001" medal, "The 90th Anniversary of the Armed Forces of Azerbaijan 1918–2008" medal, "The 95th Anniversary of the Armed Forces of Azerbaijan 1918–2013" medal.

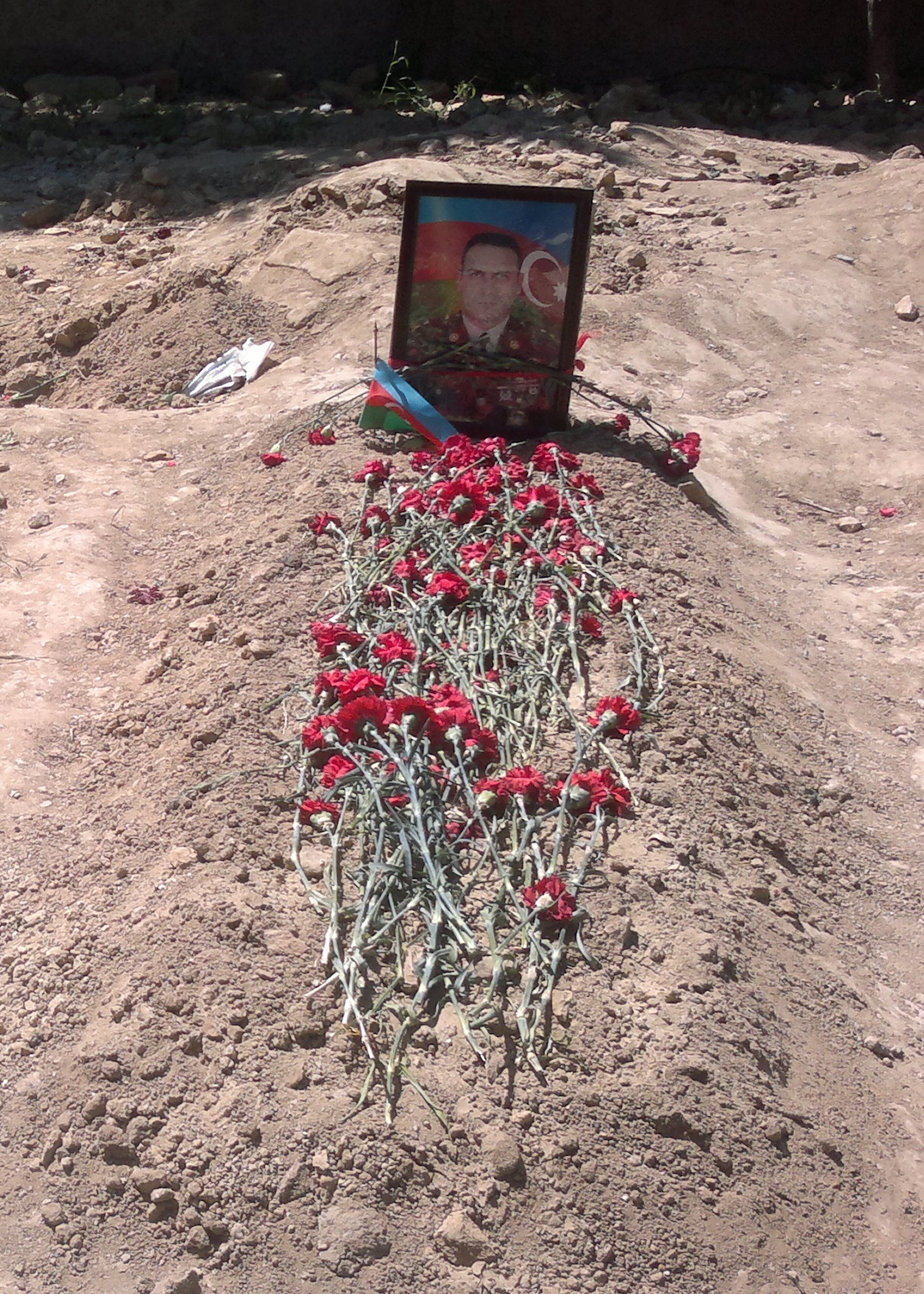
Mirzayev's grave, II Alley of Honor, Baku

Murad Mirzayev (Azerbaijani: Murad Mirzəyev, 31 March 1976 – 3 April 2016) was a lieutenant colonel of the Special Forces of Azerbaijan and a National Hero of Azerbaijan.

== Biography ==
Mirzayev was born on 31 March 1976 in Muğan Gəncəli village, Sabirabad District, Azerbaijan SSR. He studied in Jamshid Nakhchivanski Military Lyceum. In 1998 Mirzayev graduated from the High Military Academy in Turkey. He also took part in military exercises in US, Romania and Jordan.

On the night of 1 to 2 April 2016 Armenian–Azerbaijani clashes took place along the line of contact in Nagorno-Karabakh and surrounding territories to the south. On 5 April a mutual ceasefire agreement was reached. Mirzayev died on 3 April during the battles near Talysh village.

On 10 April his body of Mirzayev with the mediation of the International Committee of the Red Cross was handed over to the Azerbaijani side. On 11 April he was buried in II Alley of Honor in Baku.

On 19 April 2016 Azerbaijani President Ilham Aliyev signed orders on awarding honorary titles, orders and medals to a group of Azerbaijani military servicemen who "have distinguished exceptional bravery and heroism while preventing the Armenian military provocations on the contact line of troops and repelling the enemy's attacks on civilians from April 2 to 5". Murad Mirzayev was awarded the medal of National Hero of Azerbaijan.

He was survived by his wife, Fizza Mirzayeva, and a son and daughter.
