= Mugan =

Mugan may refer to:

- Merkhav Mugan, Israeli air raid shelter
- Mugan Khan, Central Asian Khan
- Mughan (disambiguation)
