= Yangsu Tegin =

Yangsu

Tegin of Bukhara
- Predecessor: Apa Qaghan
- Successor: Niri Qaghan
- Issue: Niri Qaghan; Poshi Dele; Bagha Shad
- House: Ashina
- Father: Muqan Qaghan
- Religion: Tengrism

Yangsu Tegin (Chinese: 鞅素特勤; fl. 6th century) was a Göktürk tegin. According to Lev Gumilyov, he was a son of Tardu, however Takeshi Osawa suggested that he was a son of Muqan Qaghan and the father of Niri Qaghan.
