= Ashina Tuwu =

- Yabgu of the Göktürks
- Successor: Bumin Qaghan
- Issue: Bumin Qaghan; Istämi
Names
- Ashina Tuwu (阿史那吐務)
- House: Ashina
- Father: Axian Shad (阿賢設)
- Religion: Tengrism

Ashina Tuwu (Chinese: 阿史那吐務) was a Göktürk chief and an ancestor of their qaghans. Besides holding the title of Da Yehu (大葉護; Grand Yabgu), little else is known about him. He was succeeded by his oldest son Ashina Tumen (the future Bumin Qaghan), the founder of the First Turkic Khaganate.

== Name ==
His Turkic birth name is unknown (Tuwu being a Chinese translation of his birth name), however, according to Bayanchur Inscriptions erected by Uyghurs nearly 2 centuries later, describe Bumin Qaghan as the successor of a certain "Yollyg Qaghan" as the leader of Ashina tribe. This implies the fact that Bumin is a son of Yollyg, which makes Yollyg identical to Tuwu, however lack of researches by scholars and historians causes an obscurity in the connection between Yollyg and Tuwu, and thus the identity of Yollyg remains unknown.

== Family ==
- Great-Great-Grandfather: Yizhi Nishidu (伊質泥師都) - Mythical ancestor of Turkic peoples, son of a she-wolf
- Great-Grandfather: Neduliu shad (訥都六設) - Eldest son of Yizhi Nishidu, legendary ancestor of Turkic clans
- Grandfather: Ashina (阿史那) - Youngest child of Neduliu shad, semi-legendary ancestor of Ashina clan
- Father: Axian shad (阿賢設) - Submitted to the Rouran
- Son: Bumin Qaghan
- Son: Istämi
