= Zemarchus =

Byzantine dignitary, ambassador of Justin II

Zemarchus (Greek: Ζήμαρχος, fl. c. 569) was a Byzantine official, diplomat and traveller in the reign of Justin II.

== Biography ==
Possible route of Zemarchus through the Caucasus and Central Asia

In the middle of the 6th century, the Göktürks conquered the Sogdiana and thus gained control of the silk trade, which then passed through Central Asia into Sassanid Persia. The Persian king, Chosroes I, dreading the intrusion of Turkic influence, refused to allow the old commerce to continue. The Turks, after many rebuffs, consented to a suggestion made by their mercantile subjects of the Soghd, and in 568 sent an embassy to Constantinople to form an alliance with the Byzantines and commence the silk trade directly with them, bypassing the Persian middlemen. The offer was accepted by Justin II, and in August 569, Zemarchus the Cilicia left Byzantium for Sogdiana.

The embassy, whose description is preserved by Menander Protector, was under the guidance of Maniakh, "chief of the people of Sogdiana", who had first, according to Menander, suggested to Dizabul Istämi (Sizaboulos in Greek sources), the great khan of the Turks, this "Roman" alliance, and had himself come to Byzantium to negotiate it. On reaching the Sogdian territories the travellers were offered iron for sale, and solemnly exorcised; Zemarchus was made to "pass through the fire" (i.e. between two fires), and ceremonies were performed over the baggage of the expedition, a bell being rung and a drum beaten over it, while flaming incense-leaves were carried round it, and incantations muttered in "Scythian".

After these precautions the envoys proceeded to the camp of Dizabul in a "hollow encompassed by the Golden Mountain", which was apparently in some locality of the Altay Mountains or Tian Shan. They found the khan surrounded by astonishing barbaric pomp: gilded thrones, golden peacocks, gold and silver plate and silver animals, hangings and clothing of figured silk. They accompanied him some way on his march against Persia, passing through Talas or Hazrat-e Turkestan in the Syr Daria valley, where Xuanzang, on his way from China to India sixty years later, met with another of Dizabul's successors.

Zemarchus was present at a banquet in Talas where the Turkic Khagan and the Persian envoy exchanged abuse; but does not seem to have witnessed actual fighting. Near the river Oēkh (possibly Syr Darya) he was sent back to Constantinople with a Turkic embassy and with envoys from various tribes subject to the Turks. Halting by the "vast, wide lagoon" (possibly of the Aral Sea), Zemarchus sent off an express messenger, one George, to announce his return to the emperor. George hurried on by the shortest route, "desert and waterless", apparently the steppes north of the Black Sea, while his superior, moving more slowly, marched twelve days by the sandy shores of the lagoon. He crossed the Emba, Ural, Volga, and Kuban (where 4000 Persians vainly lay in ambush to stop him), and passing round the western end of the Caucasus, arrived safely at Trebizond and Constantinople.

For several years this Turkic alliance subsisted, while close trade was maintained between Central Asia and Byzantium (when another Roman envoy, one Valentinos, went on his embassy in 575 he took back with him 106 Turks who had been visiting Byzantine lands) but from 579 this friendship rapidly began to cool. It is curious that all this travel between the Bosporus and Transoxiana seems not to have done anything to correct, at least in literature, the widespread misapprehension of the Caspian Sea as a gulf of the Arctic Ocean.

== See also ==
- Chronology of European exploration of Asia
