= Turkish immigration =

Turkish Immigration can refer to:

- First Turkic migration to Rumelia or Balkans that took place under Byzantine Empire before 1360
- Population exchange between Greece and Turkey in 1923 following the Treaty of Lausanne of 1922
- Russo-Turkish War immigrations
- The immigration of Turks in Bulgaria to Turkey during the Cold War
- Modern-day Turkish diaspora
