= Apa Qaghan =

Qaghan of Western Turkic Khaganate
- Reign: 581–587
- Successor: Niri Qaghan
- Born: c. 551
- Died: c. 587 (aged 35–36)
Names
- Ashina Daluobian (阿史那大邏便)
Regnal name
- Apa Qaghan (阿波可汗)
- House: Ashina
- Dynasty: Western Turkic Khaganate
- Father: Muqan Qaghan
- Religion: Tengrism

Apa Qaghan (Chinese: 阿波可汗; pinyin: Ābō Kèhán; Wade–Giles: A-po K'o-han, Middle Chinese: (Guangyun) [ʔɑ˥˩puɑ˥˩ kʰɑ˥ɣɑn˩˥]), personal name Ashina Daluobian (阿史那大邏便), was a son of Muqan Qaghan and a claimant to the throne of the Turkic Khaganate.

== Biography ==
Apa Qaghan was born Ashina Daluobian or Talopien (Chinese: 阿史那大逻便) to Muqan Qaghan and a non-Turkic concubine from a dynastic alliance, probably around 551. Lev Gumilev reconstructed his Turkic name as "Töremen" while Saadettin Gömeç proposed "Törüpen". Gumilev also equated him to Turum (Medieval Greek: Τουρούμ) who appears in Theophylact Simocatta's work. His sister was Empress Ashina, wife of Emperor Wu of Northern Zhou. He had a younger brother called Yangsu Tegin.

He rose to prominence around 581, when Ashina Anluo was enthroned. He claimed that Taspar Qaghan willed the title to him upon his death. Anluo's mother was a noble while Talopien's mother was a commoner, hence he wasn't favorable. Another cousin Ashina Shetu (later Ishbara Qaghan) supported Anluo, threatening to rebel if the throne was passed to Talopien. Meanwhile, Talopien still harassed Anluo and sent a few emissaries to force him to abdicate. Anluo, being the least powerful of the three abandoned and renounced his title in favor of Shetu. In turn Shetu made him Dier Khagan (Chinese: 第二可汗; pinyin: Dìèr Kèhán) in the Tuul River valley (now in Mongolia). Talopien also demanded a title and as a result he was made Apa Qaghan and was granted the steppe between northern Mongolia and the Altai Mountains.

Soon Emperor Wen of Sui used Zhangsun Sheng (長孫晟). According to his report, "Apa Khagan is timid and positioned between these factions. He somewhat fears Shetu and follows his lead, but his loyalty is uncertain." Apa later followed Ishbara during his raids to China. In 582, Ishbara marched on China with support from Apa and Tamgan, while Wen responded by sending his cousin Yang Hong (Chinese: 楊弘), his brother-in-law Dou Rongding (窦荣定), Dou Luji (豆盧勣), Gao Jiong and Yu Qingze (虞庆则). In May, Dou Rongding led 30,000 infantry and cavalry from Liangzhou, repeatedly defeating Apa's forces at Gaoyue Plain (northwest of present-day Minqin, Gansu). Zhangsun Sheng, serving as a deputy general in Dou Rongding's army, took the opportunity to sow discord among the Göktürks. He sent someone to tell Apa Khagan that this defeat will bring Ishbara's anger on him and his prestige will decrease. Zhangsun further advised him to submit to Sui like his cousin Tardu. Just like Zhangsun predicted, Ishbara was defeated in a battle near Baidao (白道, north of modern Hohhot) and put the blame on Apa.

In 583 Ishbara attacked Apa's camp and killed his mother. Having nowhere to turn, Apa fled west to seek refuge with Tardu. Tamgan and Tigin Shad also switched their allegiances away from Ishbara to Apa. Apa soon was given an army by Tardu and took Kucha and Kumul. Settling in Ili Valley, he increased his power to the point of appointing a lesser khagan to the west wing of his territories. Chinese sources estimate his army to be around 100,000, which was probably an exaggeration. His state was described by Zhizhi Tongjian as the Western Turkic Khaganate (Chinese: 西突厥; pinyin: Xī Tūjué).

Ishbara died in 587 and was succeeded by his younger brother Bagha, who continued the rivalry. Apa was soon captured alive by him, who asked the Sui emperor to let him kill him. But Zhangsun Sheng opposed the idea, urging the Emperor to keep him alive to keep the Göktürks in check.

According to the Book of Sui, he was succeeded by Niri Qaghan, a son of his brother Yangsu Tegin, by his supporters.

Apa Qaghan Ashina Clan
Preceded by none	Khagan of the Turkic Khaganate of Apa line 581–587	Succeeded by Niri Qaghan
