= Princess Changle (Western Wei) =

Western Wei dynasty princess

Princess Changle (長樂公主, 6th century CE), was a princess of the Western Wei dynasty during the Northern and Southern dynasties of China, whose parents are unknown. She became the queen of Turkic ruler Bumin Qaghan.

Bumin Qaghan, ruler of the Turkic Khaganate had proposed an alliance marriage to the Rouran Khagan. Yujiulü Anagui, ruler of the Rouran, was furious and sent an envoy to insult the Turkic Khagan: "You are my slaves, how dare you say such things?" Bumin Qaghan then killed the Rouran envoy after hearing this.

Bumin Qaghan then proposed marriage to the Western Wei dynasty. Yuwen Tai, who was in power at the time, agreed. In June 551, Yuwen Rui, the Grand Master of the Imperial Clan, was sent to the Turkic region to marry Bumin Qaghan to the Western Wei princess Changle, a young daughter of the Emperor.

She had one son with Bumin Qaghan, Taspar Qaghan (r. 572–581), who became the fourth ruler of the Turkic Khaganate.
