= Tariat inscriptions =

8th-century Uyghur inscription

The Tariat inscriptions appear on a stele found near the Hoid Terhyin River in Doloon Mod district, Arkhangai Province, modern-day Mongolia (the forms Terkhin and Terhyin are also used). The stele was erected by Bayanchur Khan of the Uyghur Khaganate in the middle of the eighth century (between 753 and 760 seems to be the best estimate).

== Discovery ==
Archeologists already knew of the existence of this stele because it was mentioned in another Uyghur stele found in 1909. But it took 47 years to discover and unearth the stele; finally being found by Mongolian archeologist T. Dorjsuren in 1956. The finds are now exhibited in the Mongolian Institute of Archeology in Ulaanbaatar.

== Uyghur ==
The Uyghur Khaganate replaced the Second Turkic Khaganate in Inner Asia in 74t. Its founder was Kutluk Bilge Köl (745–747). Unlike their predecessors, they were allies of the Tang dynasty and in the early days of the khaganate the khagans (rulers) supported the Tang emperor against the rebellious general An Lushan. They were one of the major powers of Asia. However, in 848 CE they were defeated by the Kyrgyz and were forced to move west to the Gansu and Xinjiang regions of modern-day China.

== Stele ==
The stele had been erected on a bixi or tortoise plinth and is made of light gray granite. There are 30 lines of text inscribed on each side of the stele in old Turkic using the Orkhon alphabet (Turkic runes) which was also used in the famous Khöshöö Tsaidam Monuments of Bilge Khagan and his brother Kül Tigin of the Turkic khaganate in 732 and 735. (Note: Together with the Bain Tsokto monument of Tonyukuk, these remains are collectively called the Orkhon Monuments.) The narrator is Bayanchur Khan of the Uyghur Khaganate who reigned between 747 and 759.

== Narration ==
Bayanchor Khan refers to himself as El etmish Bilge Kagan (not to be confused with Bilge Qaghan of the Turkic Khanate). According to inscriptions appearing on the east side of the slab, during the interregnum following the death of his father, Bayanchor fought against the tribes supporting his elder brother Tay Bilge Tutuk. Among these tribes, the Tatars seem to have been their most important enemy, as their names are mentioned several times. On the west face of the stele, a brief history of the Turkic peoples is given. It is notable that the names of Bumin Qaghan and İstemi of the Turkic Khaganate are also mentioned in the inscriptions. This may mean that the power shift from the Second Turkic Khaganate to the (linguistically indistinguishable) Uyghur Khanate was considered merely as a coup d'état.

=== Complete text ===
Old Turkic original text:

Teŋiride : bolmuš : El Etmiš Bilge : qaγan : El bilge : qatun : qaγan atïγ qatun atïγ atanïp : Őtüken kedïn učinta : Tez bašinta : örügün ......(čit) anta jaratïtdïm : barš yïlqa yïlan yïlqa : eki yïl
yajladïm : ulu yïlqa Őtüken : ortušïnta Šöŋüz ba (šïnta)Ïduq bašï kedininte : jajladim. Őrügün : bunta : jaratïdïm. Čit bunta toqïtïdïm. Bïn yïllïq : tümen künlük : Bitigimin belgümin bunta
yašï tašqa : jaratïdïm : tolqu : tašqa toqïtïm : üze kökTeŋiri yarïlqaduq : üčünasra yaγiz jer : igitük : üčün : elimen : törümen etintim : öŋre kün toγušuqdaqï : budun : kisre ay toγušuqdaqï : budun :
tört buluŋdaqï budun : küč berür yaγïm : bölüg yoq boltï : ...ekin ara ïlïγïm at ïrïγlaγïm : Sekiz Seleŋe : Orqun Toγula : Seben : Teldü : Qaraγa : Boruγu : ol jerimen šubumïn qonar köčerben :
yaγlaγïm : Őtüken : quzï kedin učï Tez bašïöŋdüni Qanuy : Künüj : biz ekin ara qïčlaγïm Őtüken jeri : Onγï Ta (rqan) süjü yaγ : budun (qa) ...γï berigerü učï : Altun : Yïš kedin üčï : Kögmen : iligerü učï Köiün
Teŋiride : bolmuš : El Etmiš Bilge : aqanïm : ičreki : buduni : altmïs Bujruq BašïÏnanču Bujruq Toquz : bolmï Bilge : Taj Seŋün...tu...bes jüz bašï Kül Oŋï : Őz ïnanču : bes jüz : bašï Uluγ Őz ïnanču
Uruŋu : jüz : bašï : Uluγ Uruŋu Töles begler oγulï : bïŋ bašï Töles Külüg Erin : Tarduš begler oγulï bïŋ bašï Tarduš Külüg : Erin : Ïšbara (s)bes bïŋ er : bašï Alip Ïšbara Seŋün Jaγlagar
.........mïs toguz jüz er : bašï : Tojgan : Uluγ Targan : buquγ bïŋa...
...budunï bïŋa qaγan Atačïq budunï bïŋa
Teŋirim qanïm : ......qan atlïγ Čiqsi aqunču : Alip : bilge...qan...Oγuz budun altï jüz Söŋüt bir tümen budun qazγantï
Teŋiri aqanïm : atlïγï Toquz Tatar...bujruq......γï...(Söŋüt bïn)budunï tegtemin : bu bitidükde : qanïma : Torγag bašï qa...Atačuq Begčeker Čiqsi birle Baγa Tarqan üč jüz Torγaq turdï
Teŋiri aqanïm : oγulï...Bilge...lïγï......isig y...buyruq Azsï Tay Seŋün budunï : Toŋra bujruq...bašï : Uč Qarlug bunča : budun : Yabγu : budunï
Teŋirim (qanïm : oγulï)...Udurγan ...č bašï Seŋün : budunï : Toquz Bayrïqu : ...bašï Basmil : Toquz Tatar : bunča budun Čad : budunï :
...anta tegdi : bunï yaratγma...Qutiuγ Tarqan...budunïγ atïn : yoiïn : yaγïma : Aium Čisi eki : ya...Qutiuγ : Bilge : Seŋün Uršu Qutluγ : Targan Seŋün : ol eki jorï
...yarïlqadï : Bayïrqu : Tarduš : Bilge Targan...Qutluγ Jaγmač : Tabγač : Šoγdaq bašï : Bilge Seŋün Ozul Šenirken
.....Jolluγ qaγan Bumïn qaγan : üč qaγan olurmis : eki jüz jïl olurmiš
......qïza barmïš : Učuz eki : atlïγnï tüke barmïs Qadar Qašar Bedi Bersel : Aj taz : Oγuz
.........ečüm : apam : sekiz on yïl : olurmiš : Őtüken Eli : Őgüres Eli : ekin ara : Orqun : ögüzde
.........yïl olurunta...yïl barmïs : atïmïn üze : kök Teŋiri : ašïra : yaγïz Jer : jana
.........ntar atantïm : sekiz otuz yašïma : yïlan yïlqa : Türük Elinte bulγadum : anta artutdïm
.........atlïγïn jamašdï bïŋa......yorïdïm : Ozmïš Tegin Udurγanta : yorïyor : Tedi : anï alγïl tedi :
.........(Kömü)r taγda Yar ögüzde üč tuγluγ Türük budunqa anta : jetinči aj : törüt jegirmike
.........anta : toqtartïm aqanïm : altïm : anta yoq boltï : Türük budunïγ anta : ičgrtim : anta jana
......Ozmïš Tegin qan boltï : qoñ yïlqa : yorïdïm
[ekinti].........bičin yïlqa yo[rïdïm]...süŋüstüm anta šančdïm qanïn anta
......tutdïm........atïštïm......el atamïš taqïγu yïlqa : yorïdïm yïl (...)besinč ay : ü yegirmike : qalčïšdï
süŋüs(dim)...ičgerip igdir bölük......ben anta kisre...ït yïlqa : Üč Qarluq : jablaq saqïnïp : Teze bardï : qurïja On oqqa
kirti : anta......(Üč Qarluq)laγzï yïlqa (Toquz Tatar)...Toguz bujruq Bes Söŋüt : qara budun : Toryan : aqaŋïm qanqa : ötünti : ečü apa atï
bar tedi...anta : yadγu a(tadi)... anta kisre : küsgü yïlqa (Esin siz)de küč : qara budun...mis : Esinsizde : küč : qara šub ermis : qara budun : Torïyan qayan
atadïTeŋiride : bolmuš : El Etmiš : Bilge qayan : atadï El bilge qatun : atadï : qaγan : atanïp : qatun atanïp : Őtüken : ortušunta : kedinin örügin : bunta : etdim
Bunï yaratïγma böke tutam
