= Mughan, Bilasuvar =

Mughan
- Municipality
- Azerbaijani: Muğan
- Location within Azerbaijan
- Coordinates: 39°32′14″N 48°39′36″E
- Country: Azerbaijan
- Rayon: Bilasuvar

Population
  - Total: 310
- Time zone: UTC+4 (AZT)
  - Summer (DST): UTC+5 (AZT)

Mughan (Azerbaijani: Muğan) is a village and the least populous municipality in the Bilasuvar District of Azerbaijan. It has a population of 310.
