= Mughan, Hajigabul =

Mughan
- Municipality
- Azerbaijani: Muğan
- Location within Azerbaijan
- Coordinates: 40°05′55″N 48°49′08″E
- Country: Azerbaijan
- District: Hajigabul

Population (2008)
  - Total: 4,668
- Time zone: UTC+4 (AZT)
  - Summer (DST): UTC+5 (AZT)

Mughan (Azerbaijani: Muğan) is a village and municipality in Hajigabul District of Azerbaijan. Mughan is the most populous municipality of the district except for the capital Hajiqabul. It has a population of 4,668.
