= Istämi =

Yabghu of the First Turkic Khaganate
- Reign: 552–575
- Successor: Tardu
- Qaghan: Bumin Qaghan (552–553); Issik Qaghan (553–554); Muqan Qaghan (554–572); Taspar Qaghan (572–574)
- Died: 575
- Issue: Tardu; Tamgan
- House: Ashina
- Father: Ashina Tuwu
- Religion: Tengrism

In the 6th century AD, Istämi (Old Turkic: 𐰃𐰾𐱅𐰢𐰃:𐰴𐰍𐰣, romanized: Istemi qaɣan or Sinjibu or Dizabul or Ishtemi Sir Yabghu Khagan; Chinese: 室點密) ruled the western part of the territory of the Göktürks, which became the Western Turkic Khaganate on the Eurasian steppe and dominated the Sogdians. He was the yabghu (vassal) of his brother Bumin Qaghan in 552 AD. Turkic sources refer to him posthumously as a khagan. Tardu was his son.

== Activities ==
During his rule Istämi established diplomatic relations with the Persian and Byzantine empires, defeated the Hepthalites, and acted as an elder statesman during the disintegration of the eastern half of the empire. A great deal is known about him from the diplomatic missions of the Byzantine Empire.

Shortly after the smuggling of silkworm eggs into the Byzantine Empire from China by Nestorian Christian monks, the 6th-century Byzantine historian Menander Protector wrote of how the Sogdians attempted to establish direct trade of Chinese silk with the Byzantine Empire. After forming an alliance with the Sassanid ruler Khosrow I to defeat the Hephthalites, Istämi was approached by Sogdian merchants requesting permission to seek an audience with the Sassanid king of kings for the privilege of traveling through Persian territories to trade with the Byzantines. Istämi refused the first request, but when he sanctioned the second one and had the Sogdian embassy sent to the Sassanid king, the latter had the members of the embassy poisoned to death. Maniah, a Sogdian diplomat, convinced Istämi to send an embassy directly to Byzantium's capital Constantinople, which arrived in 568 and offered not only silk as a gift to Byzantine ruler Justin II, but also proposed an alliance against Sassanid Persia. Justin II agreed and sent an embassy to the Turkic Khaganate, ensuring the direct silk trade desired by the Sogdians.

As the brother of Bumin Qaghan he ruled the far-western region of their khanate. Tardu was his son. As a Yabghu, he was autonomous and had de facto sovereignty while officially recognizing the authority of the qaghan. After Khushu's death he arranged the division of the territory into three realms east, central, and west and distributed them between Jotan, Arslan, and Shetu, respectively.

== See also ==
- Tardu
- Tamgan

Istämi Ashina Clan
Preceded by none	Yabgu of the First Turkic Khaganate; 552–575	Succeeded by Tardus
