= Mughan, Jalilabad =

Mughan
- Azerbaijani: Muğan
- Location within Azerbaijan
- Coordinates: 39°07′25″N 48°35′36″E
- Country: Azerbaijan
- Rayon: Jalilabad

Population
  - Total: 1,852
- Time zone: UTC+4 (AZT)
  - Summer (DST): UTC+5 (AZT)

Mughan (Azerbaijani: Muğan; known as Svetlaya Zarya until 2001) is a village and municipality in the Jalilabad District of Azerbaijan. It has a population of 1,852.
