= Taspar Qaghan =

Qaghan of the First Turkic Khaganate
- Reign: 572–581
- Predecessor: Muqan Qaghan
- Successor: Amrak
- Born: 552/553
- Died: 581
- Spouse: Princess Qianjin (大义公主)
- Issue: Amrak
- House: Ashina
- Father: Bumin Qaghan
- Mother: Changle
- Religion: Buddhism

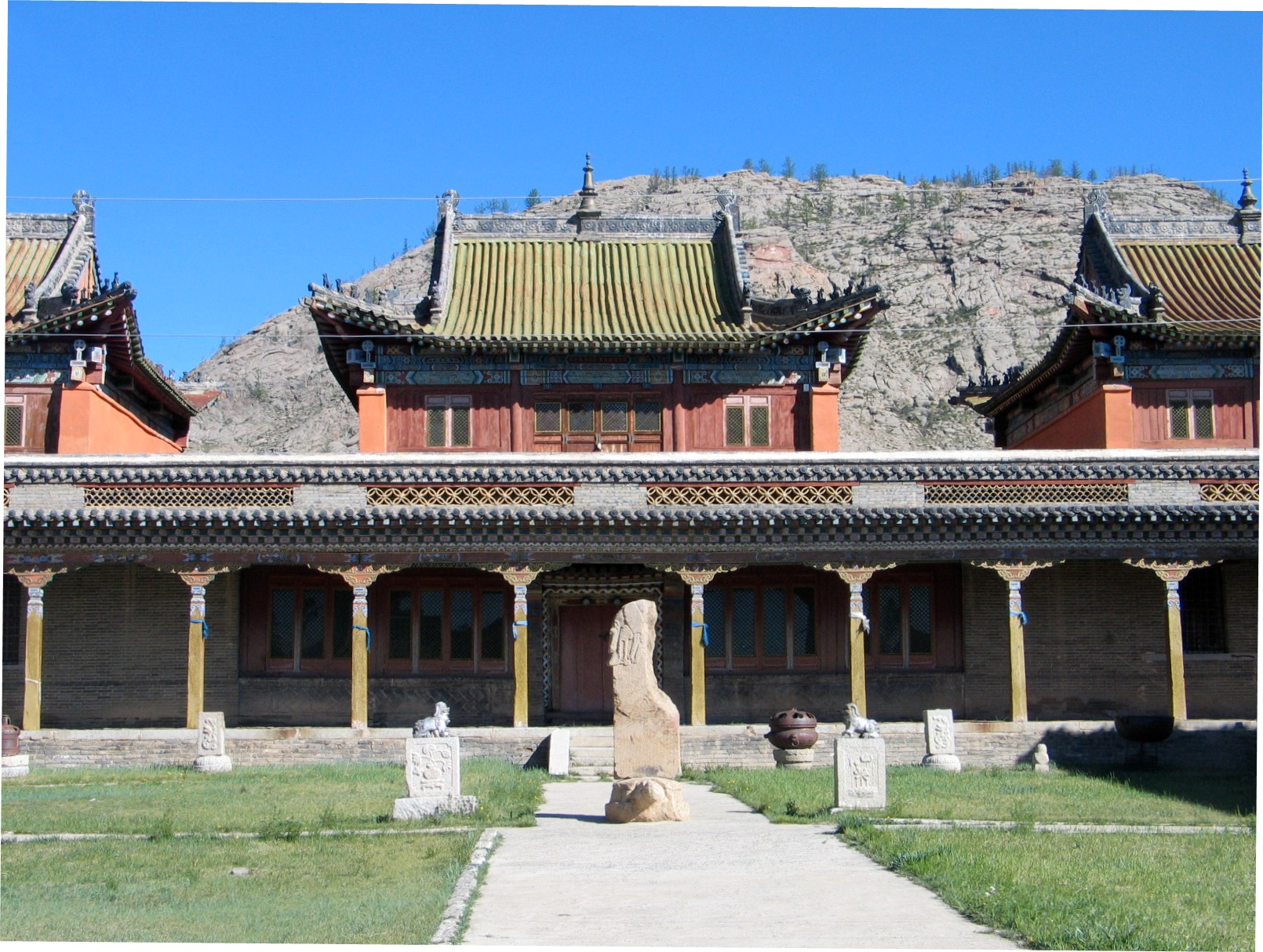
Zayiin Gegeen Monastery, Tsetserleg Lamaist monastery, Mongolia

Taspar Qaghan (Sogdian: t’asp’r γ’γ’n) or Tatpar Qaghan (Sogdian: t’tp’r x’γ’n, Rouran: Tadpar qaɣan; Old Turkic: 𐱃𐱃𐰯𐰺𐰴𐰍𐰣 Tatpar qaγan, 佗缽可汗/佗钵可汗, Pinyin: tuóbō Kèhán, Wade-Giles: t'o-po k'o-han), personal name Ashina Açu (Sogdian: "cw), was the third son of Bumin Qaghan, with princess Wei Changle (長樂公主), and the fourth khagan of the First Turkic Khaganate (572–581).

== Name ==
One passage of the Sogdian transliteration text on the Bugut stele has been read (in the standard scholarly edition) and can be tentatively rendered as: (Sogdian Transliteration: βγy wr-kwp-’r cr-’’cw mγ’’ t’tp’r x’γ’n, Transcription: Baġa Urkupär (Urkäpär) Črāču (Čor Aču) Maġa Tatpar Qaɣan)

A literal gloss of this rendering is:

- (βγy) (Sogdian: bgy) is read as bäg / bagha (a lordly/epithet form often translated as "lord" or "divine")
- (wrkwp’r) corresponds to Urkäpär (a personal epithet or nick-name element)
- (cr) corresponds to the Turkic rank čor (a known steppe/military title)
- (’’cw) corresponds to the personal name Aču / Aju (Note: Same name as Aču Khagan of the Yenisei Kyrgyz Khaganate)
- (mγ’’) is read as Maġa / Magha (an epithet/title attested in Sogdian contexts)
- ("t’tp’r x’γ’n) corresponds to Tatpar Qaɣan (the regnal name and the title "qaγan")

This reading treats the Sogdian text as a chain of epithets and titles (epithet + rank + personal name + epithet + regnal name + qaγan), rather than a single continuous birth-name. The reconstruction is tentative: the Sogdian orthography and the epigraphic damage permit several alternate readings, and editors note possible variant spellings and uncertainties in individual graphemes.

== Reign ==
Taspar Qaghan's reign saw further rise of Turkic power even to the point calling both Zhou and Qi emperors his sons. He appointed his nephews Ashina Shetu as Erzhu khagan in the east and Börü khagan in the west as lesser khagans.

He switched his alliance from Zhou to Qi. He sent a horse as gift in 572 and granted defeated Qi prince Gao Shaoyi asylum. He transferred former Northern Qi subjects, whether they fled to or were captured by the Göktürks, to be under Gao Shaoyi's command. However, he still maintained good relationship with Zhou, sending another horse as a gift in 574.

Around the new year 578, Gao Baoning, sent a petition to Gao Shaoyi, requesting that he take the imperial title. Gao Shaoyi therefore declared himself emperor, with military assistance from the Göktürks.

Taspar attacked Zhou repeatedly until the spring of 579, when he sought peace with the Northern Zhou. Emperor Xuan of Northern Zhou made the daughter of his uncle Yuwen Zhao (宇文招) the Princess Qianjin, offering to give her to Taspar in marriage if he would be willing to surrender Gao Shaoyi. Taspar refused.

In 580, after Emperor Xuan's death, Yang Jian, the regent for Emperor Xuan's son Emperor Jing of Northern Zhou, nevertheless sent Princess Qianjin to the Göktürks to marry Taspar Qaghan. After the marriage, Yang sent the official Heruo Yi (賀若誼) to the Göktürks to bribe Taspar to give up Gao Shaoyi. He agreed, and as a ruse, he invited Gao Shaoyi to a hunt, but instead had Heruo Yi capture Gao Shaoyi. In the fall of 580, Gao Shaoyi was delivered to the Northern Zhou's capital Chang'an, and he was exiled to modern Sichuan.

Taspar died in 581 from illness, leaving the throne to his nephew Talopien.

== Legacy ==
Unlike his father and older brothers he embraced Chinese culture, especially Buddhism. He was converted to Buddhism by the Qi monk Huilin, for whom he built a pagoda. Taspar's death marked the beginning of a long decline and subjugation of the Göktürks to China. During his reign there was a flood of Sogdian Manichean refugees from Persia and Buddhist refugees from Qi and Zhou, both the result of pogroms. These Sogdians devised the Göktürk Runes to write the Turkic language, for translations of the sutras to Turkic, notably the Nirvana Sutra in 575.

== Succession ==
Taspar's death created a dynastic crisis in the khaganate. His Chinese wife Qianjin survived him, but Taspar bequeathed his throne to Talopien, the son of his elder brother Muqan Qaghan. His bequest ran contrary to the traditional system of inheritance which demanded the throne to be passed to the son of the eldest brother, in this case Ishbara Qaghan. The council rejected the legality of Taspar's will stating his mother was of non-Turkic origin. Thus they appointed Amrak as the next khagan. Talopien's faction did not recognize Amrak. This crisis ultimately resulted in the civil war of 581–603, which greatly weakened the state.

== Family ==
He had at least two issues:

- Amrak Khagan
- Tughrul shad
  - Qilibi Khagan

== Notes ==
Taspar Qaghan Ashina Clan
Preceded by Muqan Qaghan	Khagan of the Turkic Khaganate; 572–581	Succeeded by Amrak
