= Mughan Ganjali =

- Municipality
- Azerbaijani: Muğan Gəncəli
- Location within Azerbaijan
- Coordinates: 39°42′53″N 48°57′03″E
- Country: Azerbaijan
- Rayon: Sabirabad

Population
  - Total: 1,713
- Time zone: UTC+4 (AZT)
  - Summer (DST): UTC+5 (AZT)

Mughan Ganjali (Azerbaijani: Muğan Gəncəli) is a village and municipality in the Sabirabad District of Azerbaijan. It has a population of 1,713. The village was renamed in honor of the dynasties coming from Ganja city of Azerbaijan in the 16th and 17th centuries.
