= Issik Qaghan =

Second qaghan of Turkic Qaghanate

Qaghan of the First Turkic Khaganate
- Reign: 552–553
- Predecessor: Illig Qaghan
- Successor: Muqan Qaghan
- Died: 553
- Issue: Ishbara Qaghan; Bagha Qaghan
Names
- Ashina Kolo (阿史那科羅) or Ashina Dayuan (阿史那大原)
Regnal name
- Issik Qaghan (乙息記可汗) or Ayi Qaghan (阿逸可汗) or Xiejiesuona Qaghan (纈傑娑那可汗)
- House: Ashina
- Dynasty: First Turkic Khaganate
- Father: Illig Qaghan

Issik Qaghan (Chinese: 乙息記可汗; pinyin: Yǐxījì Kèhán), personal name Ashina Kolo (阿史那科羅), was the second ruler of the First Turkic Khaganate. He was a son of Illig Qaghan and the father of Ishbara Qaghan.

== Name ==
His personal name recorded in Chinese sources was Ashina Kolo (Chinese: 阿史那科羅) which is reconstructible in Middle Chinese as *kʰuâ-lâ according to Peter Golden. According to him, this was a transliteration of the Old Turkic: 𐰴𐰺𐰀, romanized: Qara, lit. 'Black'. His regnal name Yixiji was reconstructed by Ahmet Taşağıl as Ilji. He is also referred to as Ayi Qaghan (Chinese: 阿逸可汗, romanized: Āyì Kèhán) in Cefu Yuangui.

Zhu Zhenghong, who analyzed his great-grandson Shi Shanying's epitaph, argued that in Turkic cosmology, colors correspond to cardinal directions, with "black" representing north. He proposed that "Kolo" was not his personal name, but a political title he held before becoming qaghan. As Bumin's eldest son, he was stationed in the north to govern the Tiele tribes, hence the title "Black" (Qara). Epitaph referred to Issik as Xiejiesuona Qaghan (Chinese: 纈傑娑那可汗, romanized: Xiéjié Suōnà Kèhán). Zhenghong believes this was a regnal title that could be reconstructed as Old Turkic: 𐰃𐰠:𐱃𐰆𐰣𐰍𐰀:𐰴𐰍𐰣, romanized: *İl Tunga Qağan, lit. 'State Hero Qaghan'. Moreover, according to Zhu Zhenghong, Issik Qaghan's personal name was Dayuan (Chinese: 大原, romanized: Dàyuán), based on his analysis of Ashina Zhong's tomb.

== Rule ==
In 552, he defeated the Rouran khagan Yujiulü Dengzhu near Mulai Mountain to north of Woye Town (modern Wuyuan County, Inner Mongolia). Between March and April 553, Issik Qaghan sent envoys to present 50,000 horses to Western Wei. Before dying of illness later that year, he passed the throne to his younger brother who became Muqan Qaghan. All Eastern Turkic Qaghanate rulers were descended from him through his sons Ishbara Qaghan and Bagha Qaghan.

Issik Qaghan Ashina Clan
Preceded by Bumin Qaghan	Khagan of the Turkic Khaganate; 552–553	Succeeded by Muqan Qaghan
