= Bumin Qaghan =

Founder of the Turkic Khaganate (d. 552 AD)

Illig Qaghan

Qaghan of the First Turkic Khaganate
- Reign: 552
- Coronation: 552 in Altai Mountains
- Successor: Issik Qaghan
- Died: 552
- Spouse: Unknown wives; Princess Changle; (551)
- Issue: Issik Qaghan; Muqan Qaghan; Taspar Qaghan
Names
- Ashina Tumen (阿史那土門)
Regnal name
- Illig Qaghan (伊利可汗)
- House: Ashina
- Dynasty: First Turkic Khaganate
- Father: Ashina Tuwu
- Religion: Tengrism

Bumin Qaghan (Old Turkic: 𐰉𐰆𐰢𐰣:𐰴𐰍𐰣, romanized: Bumïn qaɣan; Chinese: 布民可汗; died 552 AD), personal name Ashina Tumen (阿史那土門), regnal name Illig Qaghan (伊利可汗), was the founder of the First Turkic Khaganate. He was the eldest son of the Göktürk chieftain Ashina Tuwu. Prior to establishing the First Turkic Khaganate, he served as chieftain of the Göktürks in subordination to the Rouran Khaganate. He is also mentioned as a tumen (土門 or 吐門; "commander of ten thousand") of the Rouran Khaganate.

== Name ==
The name Tumen (Early Middle Chinese: 土門, romanized: thɔ'-mən and Late Middle Chinese: 土門, romanized: t^{h}uə'mun) found in Chinese historical records (such as the Book of Zhou and Book of Sui) and Bumin Qaghan found in Old Turkic inscriptions are considered to refer to the same person: the founder of the Turkic Khaganate. However, the two names do not match phonetically. Turcologist Volker Rybatzki suggested that "Bumin" can be analyzed from an Iranian linguistic perspective, splitting it into the root bum- and the suffix -in. The suffix -in often appears in Sogdian to indicate a nickname or patronymic. The root bum- can be compared to Old Sanskrit bhūmi ("earth, ground, soil, land"), Old Persian būmī- ("earth"), and Sogdian ßωmh ("earth, land, world").

According to turcologist Rui Chuanming, tu (土) means "earth, soil, territory," and men (門) means "entrance, faction, clan." Given the strong influence of Sogdian culture on the First Turkic Khaganate, the meaning of the name "Bumin" may have been introduced to China by Sogdians, where the Chinese then translated it into "Tu-men"—a name that captures both the sound (approximated) and the meaning, according to his theory. He suggested that "Bumin" might have been an alternative title for Tumen that was not recorded by Chinese historians.

Other theories suggest "Tumen" is a transliteration of the Turkic word for "ten thousand" (tümen). Sui and Tang historian Cen Zhongmian believed "Bumin" originated from the Sanskrit bhuman ("vast, wealthy").

== Early life and reign ==
According to the History of the Northern Dynasties and the Zizhi Tongjian, in 545 Tumen's tribe started to rise and frequently invaded the western frontier of Wei. The chancellor of Western Wei, Yuwen Tai, sent An Nuopanto (安諾盤陀, Nanai-Banda, a Sogdian from Bukhara) as an emissary to the Göktürk chieftain Tumen, in an attempt to establish a commercial relationship. In 546, Tumen paid tribute to the Western Wei state. Tumen later put down a revolt of the Tiele tribes, accepting the surrender of over 50,000 households against the Rouran Khaganate, their overlords.

Following this, Tumen felt entitled to request of the Rouran a princess to be his wife. The Rouran khagan, Yujiulü Anagui, sent a message refusing this request and adding: "You are my blacksmith slave. How dare you utter these words?" Bumin got angry, killed Anagui's emissary, and severed relations with the Rouran Khaganate. Anagui's "blacksmith" (Chinese: 鍛奴, romanized: duànnú) insult was recorded in Chinese chronicles. Some sources state that members of the Turks did serve as blacksmiths for the Rouran elite, and that "blacksmith slavery" may refer to a kind of vassalage that prevailed in Rouran society. Nevertheless, after this incident Bumin emerged as the leader of the revolt against the Rouran.

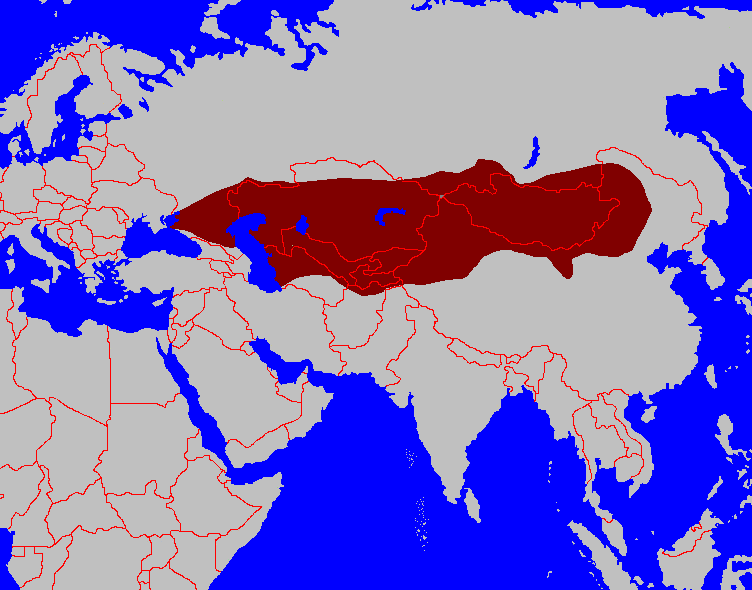
Gokturk khaganate.

In 551, Bumin requested a Western Wei princess for marriage. Yuwen Tai permitted it and sent Princess Changle of Western Wei to Bumin in July or August 551. In the same year Emperor Wen of Western Wei died, and Bumin sent a mission and gave two hundred horses.

The Book of Zhou does not explicitly date revolt of the Tiele. Sima Guang's Zizhi Tongjian places it in 551, but historian Cen Zhongmian argued this dating is incorrect. According to him, since Tumen subsequently requested marriages from both Rouran and Western Wei, the defeat of the Tiele could not have happened as late as 551. Scholars Xue Zongzheng and Wu Yugui agree, with Xue further speculating the event occurred in 550 or earlier.

The beginning of formal diplomatic relations with China propped up Bumin's authority among the Turks. He eventually united the local Turkic tribes and ended their subservience to the Rouran. In February or March 552 Bumin's army defeated Anagui's forces at the north of Huaihuang and then Anagui committed suicide. With their defeat Bumin proclaimed himself Illig Qaghan and made his wife qaghatun. Marcel Erdal compared "Illig" to ilkhan (i.e. ruler of people) in Old Turkic. Rybatzki instead translated this title as "qaghan who has a land". According to the Bilge Qaghan's memorial complex and the Kul Tigin's memorial complex, Bumin and Istemi ruled people by Turkic laws and they developed them.

== Death and family ==
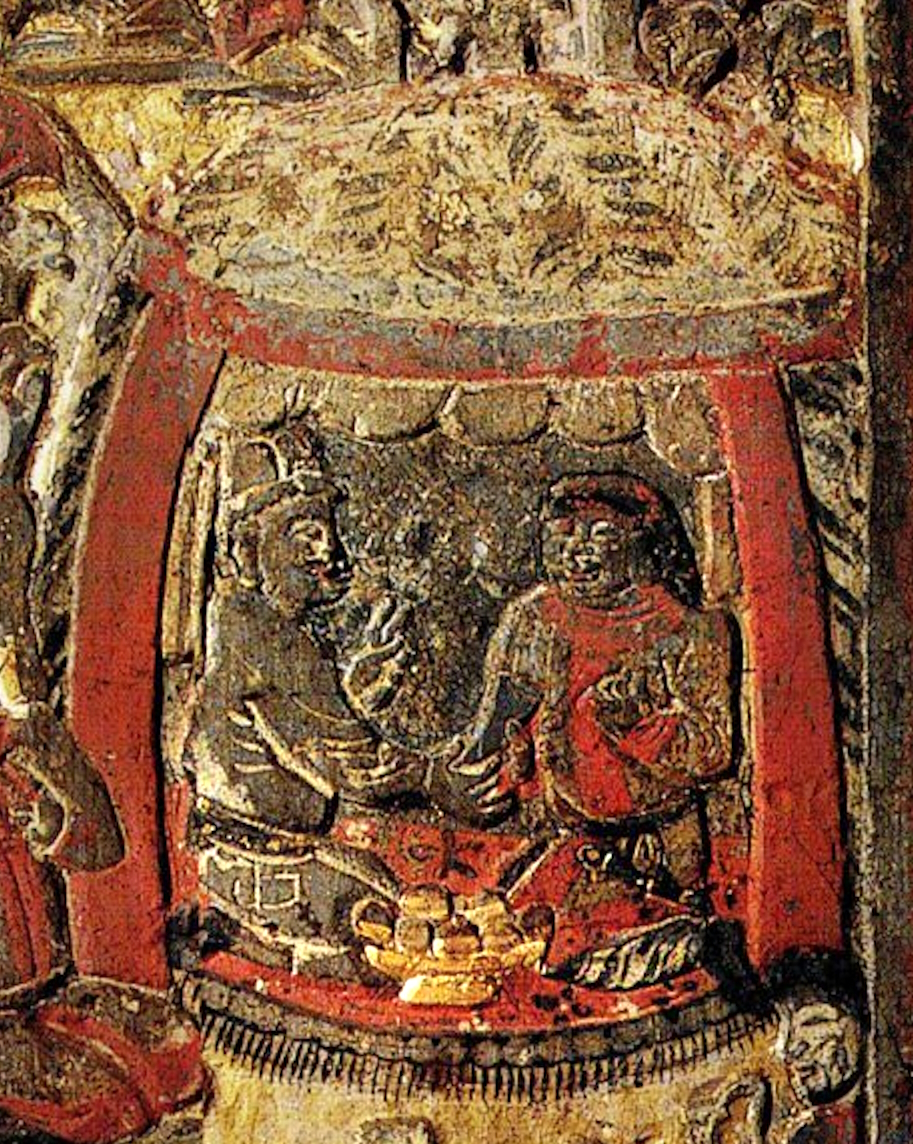
Contemporary depiction of the encounter in a Turkic yurt of the Sogdian trader An Jia (left) and a Turkic Chieftain (right). 579 CE, Tomb of An Jia, Xi’an, China.

Bumin died within several months of proclaiming himself Illig Qaghan. Xue Zongzheng believes the cause of death was injuries sustained during the war with the Rouran. He had a younger brother called Istämi who ruled westernpost portions of the qaghanate.

Wives and children:

- Unnamed Turkic khatun(s)
  - Issik Qaghan (r. 552–553)
  - Muqan Qaghan (r. 553–572)
  - Taspar Qaghan (however Baatar Urgunbuyan claims Princess Changle of Western Wei was his mother)
  - Kutlug (Chinese: 阿史那庫頭, romanized: Āshǐnà Kùtóu) appointed by Muqan Qaghan to be the lesser khagan of the Eastern Turkic Empire with title Ditou Qaghan (地頭可汗)
  - Mahan Tegin (d. 581) — lesser khagan appointed by Taspar Qaghan
  - Rudan Qaghan (Chinese: 褥但可汗) — he is defined almost entirely by his relationship to others rather than his own actions. Might be the brother poisoned by Northern Qi in the Baoding era (561–565).
    - Böri Qaghan (步離可汗) - Lesser khagan of west appointed by Taspar Qaghan

=== Genetics ===
A complete genetic analysis of Empress Ashina (551–582), Bumin Qaghan' granddaughter through his son Muqan Qaghan, by Xiaoming Yang et al. in 2023, found nearly exclusively Ancient Northeast Asian ancestry (97,7%) next to minor West-Eurasian components (2,7%), and no Chinese ("Yellow River") admixture. This supports the Northeast Asian origin of the Ashina tribe. According to the authors, these findings "once again validates a cultural diffusion model over a demic diffusion model for the spread of Turkic languages".

=== Legacy ===
The Tariat Inscriptions from the Uyghur Khaganate period mention a certain Bumin Qaghan, but due to severe damage to the stone face, it cannot be confirmed if this Bumin Qaghan is indeed him. The Ongin Inscription from the Second Khaganate period mentions a certain Yamï Qağan (Old Turkic: 𐰖𐰢𐰃:𐰴𐰍𐰣, romanized: Yamï qaɣan) who some believe may be Bumin Qaghan, though this interpretation remains controversial. Several scholars, including early researchers Wilhelm Radloff and Josef Marquart, as well as contemporary scholar Takashi Ōsawa, have identified this figure as Bumin Qaghan, suggesting "Yama" is a variant reference to the founder of the khaganate. However, this identification remains a subject of academic debate and is not universally accepted; scholars such as Gerard Clauson and Talat Tekin have challenged this reading, and Chinese researchers Geng Shimin and Rui Chuanming note that the interpretation of the text is still controversial.

== Sources ==
- Cen, Zhongmian (1958). 突厥集史 [A Collection of History of the Turks] (in Chinese). Beijing: Zhonghua Book Company.
- Geng, Shimin (2005). 古代突厥文碑銘研究 [A Study of Ancient Turkic Inscriptions] (in Chinese). Beijing: Minzu University of China.
- Rui, Chuanming (2017). 古突厥碑銘研究 [Research on Old Turkic Inscriptions] (in Chinese) (Revised ed.). Beijing: The Commercial Press.

Bumin Qaghan Ashina Clan
Preceded by none	Qaghan of the First Turkic Khaganate; 552	Succeeded by Issik Qaghan
