= Muqan Qaghan =

Khagan of the Göktürks

Qaghan of the First Turkic Khaganate
- Reign: 553–572
- Predecessor: Issik Qaghan
- Successor: Taspar Qaghan
- Died: 572
- Spouse: A Turkic wife (childless). A non-Turkic wife.
- Issue: Apa Qaghan; Empress Ashina; Yangsu Tegin
Names
- Ashina Yandu (阿史那燕都)
Regnal name
- Muqan Qaghan (木杆可汗 or 木汗可汗)
- House: Ashina
- Father: Illig Qaghan
- Mother: Unrecorded
- Religion: Tengrism

Muqan Qaghan (Old Turkic: 𐰢𐰆𐰴𐰣:𐰴𐰍𐰣, romanized: Muqan qaɣan, Chinese: 木杆可汗/木汗可汗; pinyin: Mùgān Kèhán/Mùhàn Kèhán; Sogdian: 𐼍𐼇𐼉𐼒𐼎 𐼉𐼒𐼄𐼒𐼎, romanized: mwx’n x’ɣ’n; Rouran: 𑀫𑀼𑀖𑀅𑀦 𑀕𑀅𑀖𑀅𑀦, romanized: Muɣan Qaɣan), personal name Ashina Yandu (Note: Sometimes spelled as 'Yentou', a name also used by another Göktürk prince, a son of Yami Qaghan of Eastern Türks.) (阿史那燕都), was the second son of Illig Qaghan and the third qaghan of the First Turkic Khaganate. He expanded the khaganate and secured its borders against the Hephthalites.

== Name ==
According to Sergey Kljaštornyj and Vladimir Livšic, this ruler is mentioned in the 3rd and 5th lines of the Left Side and the 3rd lines of the Front Side of the Sogdian Bugut Inscription as "mwγ’n γ’γ’n", and according to Yutaka Yoshida and Takao Moriyasu, in the 2nd, 3rd and 5th lines of the B-1 Side and the 3rd lines of the B-2 Side as "mwx’n x’γ’n." Turkish researchers Talat Tekin, Ahmet Taşağıl, Ahmet Bican Ercilâsun as well as Christopher Beckwith reconstructed his Turkic regnal name as Buqan and equated him to Bokhanos (Βώχανος) of Menander Protector.

== Biography ==
He was born Ashina Yandu (阿史那燕都) to Bumin Qaghan and was made irkin during his lifetime. He succeeded his elder brother Issik Khagan in a lateral succession in 553. Upon succession, he appointed his younger brother Ashina Kutou (阿史那庫頭) as lesser khagan in the east.

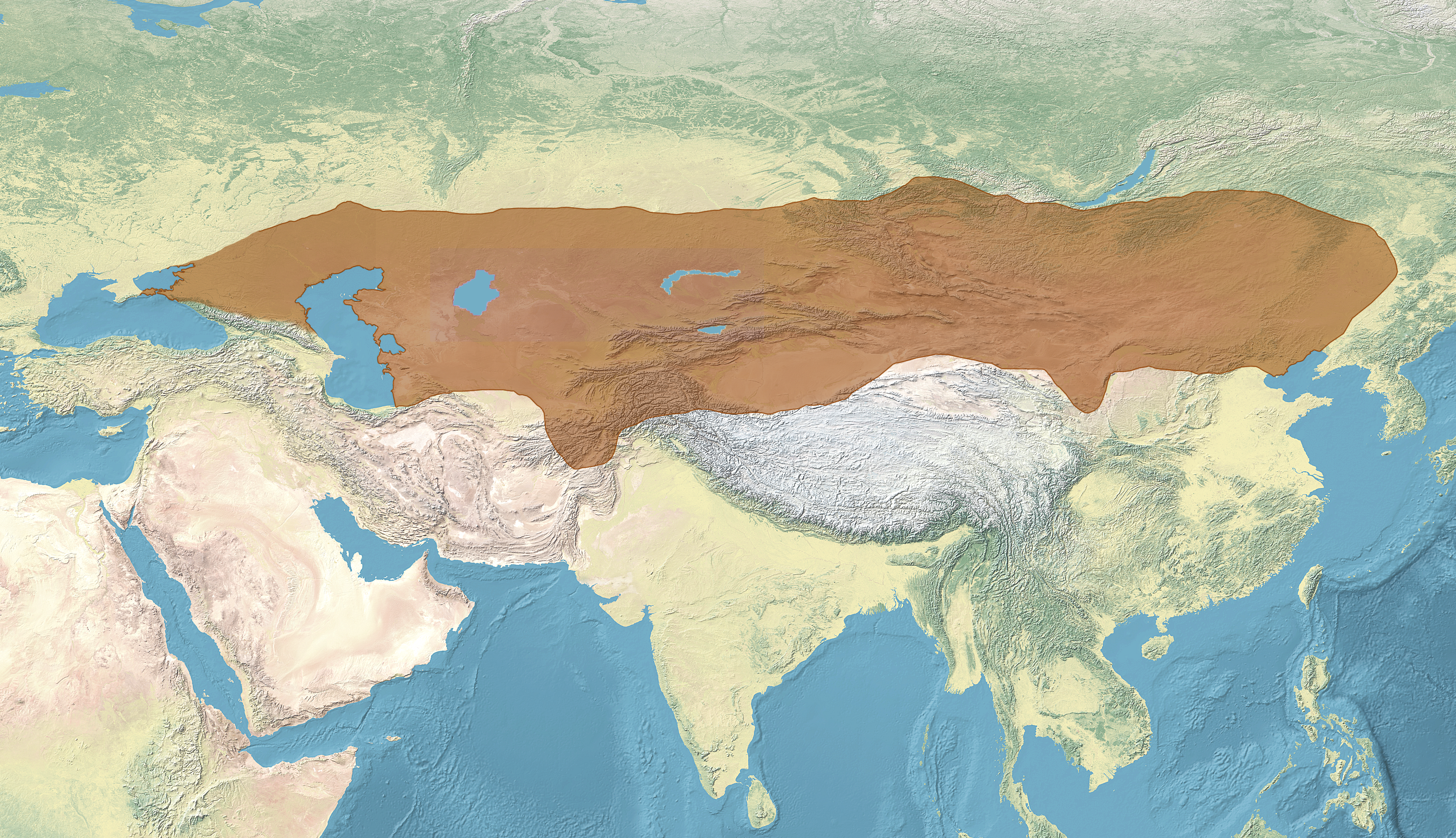
Map of the Göktürk Qaghanate ("First Turkic Khaganate") and contemporary polities, circa 576, at the end of Muqan Qaghan's reign.

His accession to power was followed by finishing off remnants of the Rouran. Around the new year 554, after the defeat of Yujiulü Kangti at the hands of Göktürks, the remnants of the Rouran, which by that point was near its end, surrendered to the Northern Qi to seek protection from Gökturk attacks. Emperor Wenxuan personally attacked Muqan Qaghan, fighting off his army and then made Yujiulü Anluochen the new khagan of Rouran, settling the Rouran people within Northern Qi territory, at Mayi (馬邑, in modern Shuozhou, Shanxi). The last khagan of the Rouran Yujiulü Dengshuzi was executed by Emperor Gong in 555 because of Gökturks' pressure.

Muqan led an attack on Tuyuhun territory in 556 together with the Western Wei. According to the plan, Muqan was to attack Hezhen (near present-day Chaka Salt Lake, Qinghai) from the north and general Shi Ning (史寧) was to attack Shudun (near Gonghe County). The siege was a success as the Tuyuhun king Murong Kualu's wife, children and treasure was captured, but he returned to his homeland after the Turks withdrew. As the army prepared to withdraw, Muqan Qaghan gifted Ning 100 slaves, 500 horses, and 10,000 sheep.

He then defeated the Hephthalites to the west near Bukhara in 557 together with Khosrow I, however this battle was largely overseen by Muqan's uncle Istami. He routed the Khitan to the east, and annexed the Kyrgyz to the north. This expansion also pushed against the Avars who were driven towards the Byzantine Empire and the Sassanid Empire and eventually towards the Danube. Other tribes of Central Asia, such as the eastern Bulgars were also displaced.

=== Marriage proposals ===
Muqan proposed to marry his daughter to Yuwen Tai in 556, but his death prevented this. After the establishment of the Northern Zhou by Emperor Ming, Muqan sent gifts and an emissary to establish contact in 558. At first he wanted to marry his daughter to Emperor Wu of Northern Zhou, however, she was also being courted by Emperor Wucheng of Northern Qi, which caused Muqan some indecision. Ultimately, Emperor Wu of Northern Zhou took the extra step of dispatching Yang Jian, the Governor of Liangzhou, along with Wang Qing (王慶) and others to formally propose the marriage. In fall 563, Northern Zhou entered into an alliance treaty with the Göktürks against the Northern Qi, part of which involved a promise that Emperor Wu would marry the daughter of Muqan Qaghan.

In the winter of 563, the joint forces of the Northern Zhou and Gökturks launched a two-prong attack on the Northern Qi, with the northern prong attacking the Northern Qi's secondary capital Jinyang (晉陽, in modern Taiyuan, Shanxi) and the southern prong attacking Pingyang (平陽, in modern Linfen, Shanxi).

In the spring of 565, Emperor Wu sent his brother Yuwen Chun (宇文純), Yuwen Gui (宇文貴), Dou Yi (竇毅) and Yang Jian (楊薦) to lead a ceremonial guard corps to Tujue to welcome back Muqan's daughter for marriage to him. However, when they arrived at Muqan's headquarters, he turned against the treaty and detained Yuwen Chun and his attendants.

In the spring of 568, a major storm at the Göktürks' headquarters inflicted substantial damage, and Muqan Qaghan took it as a sign of divine displeasure at his rescission of the marriage agreement with the Northern Zhou. He therefore returned Yuwen Chun, along with the daughter he promised Emperor Wu, back to Northern Zhou. Emperor Wu personally welcomed her and made her empress.

After Muqan's death in 572 the title of Qaghan passed to his younger brother Taspar.

== Legacy ==
Muqan's reign marked the pinnacle of Sogdian cultural influence in the Göktürk Empire. Sogdian culture was transmitted by merchants from Turpan who worked as ambassadors and advisers. The Sogdian language and script were used to govern the empire.

Muqan Qaghan was friendly to Buddhist people, and is credited with being the first to introduce Buddhism to the Türks. He promoted the construction of a Türkic Buddhist temple in the Northern Zhou capital city of Chang'an. Despite his promotion of Buddhism in China, it is not known if he himself converted to Buddhism, and it is also uncertain whether or not a substantial number of Türks were Buddhists during his reign.

== Physical appearance ==
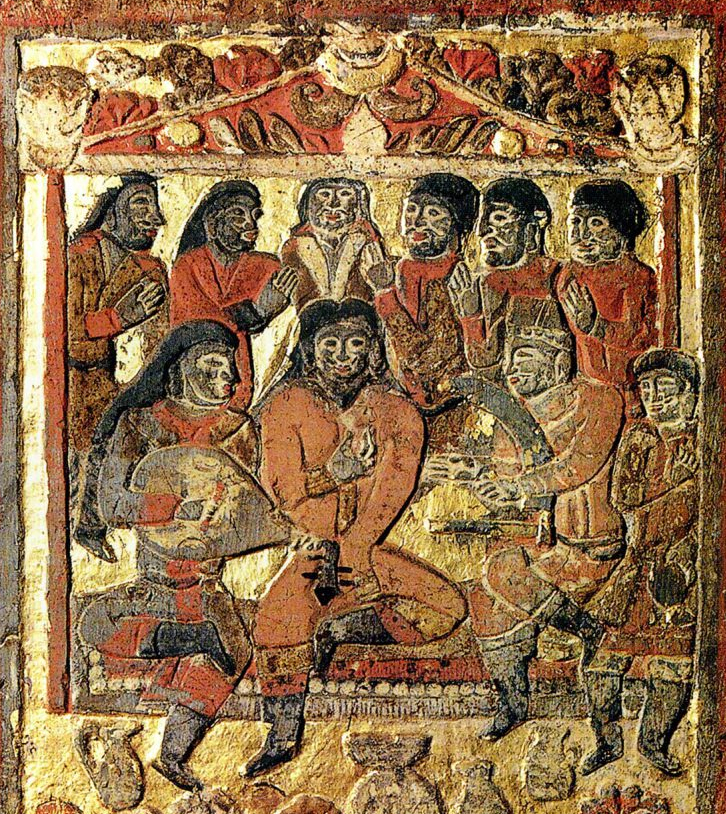
Contemporary depiction of the reception of a noble Turk (center, with his retinue to the left) in the residence of the Sogdian trader An Jia (right half). 579 CE, Tomb of An Jia, Xi’an, China.

Muqan Qaghan was described by Chinese authors as having an unusual appearance. He had a red complexion, his face was wide, and his eyes were described as like "colored glazes" (using the term "琉璃" (liúli), "glaze"):

"狀貌奇異，面廣尺餘，其色赤甚，眼若琉璃。"
"His appearance was strange, his face was broad, his complexion was red, his eyes were like glazes".

Some authors have translated the term "琉璃" ("glaze") as "lapis lazuli"-like (suggesting a blue color).

He was characterized as being "tough and fierce", and he was regarded as brave and knowledgeable by historians.

A complete genetic analysis of Muqan Qaghan's daughter Empress Ashina (551–582) in 2023 by Xiaoming Yang et al. found nearly exclusively Ancient Northeast Asian ancestry (97,7%) next to minor West-Eurasian components (2,7%), and no Chinese ("Yellow River") admixture. This supports the Northeast Asian origin of the Ashina tribe and the Göktürk Khanate. According to the authors, these findings "once again validates a cultural diffusion model over a demic diffusion model for the spread of Turkic languages.

== Family ==
Muqan Qaghan's Türkic wife was childless. This caused difficulties for his son Talopien, as he was born to a non-Turkic woman who Muqan had married for diplomatic reasons.

His daughter Empress Ashina became the wife of Emperor Wu of Northern Zhou. His son Talopien, as Apa Qaghan unsuccessfully claimed the throne after the death of his uncle Taspar while his other son Yangsu Tegin was ancestor of the later Western Turkic Qaghans.

== Notes ==
Muqan Qaghan Ashina Clan
Preceded by Issik Qaghan	Khagan of the Turkic Khaganate; 554–572	Succeeded by Taspar Qaghan
