= Ashina tribe =

Ruling dynasty of the Gökturk Khaganate

Ashina
阿史那 Āshǐnà
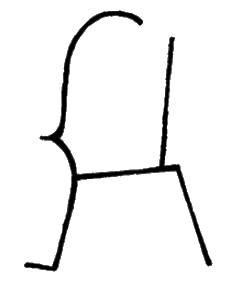
- The tamga of the Ashina clan, representing the mountain goat

Regions with significant populations
- Central and East Asia

Languages
- Old Turkic; Middle Chinese; Sogdian; Tocharian (Note: "Moreover, the two most senior titles after that of the khagan in the Turkic Khaganate were shad, which had Iranian roots and yabghu, of Tocharian origin.")

Religion
- Tengrism; Buddhism (minority)

The Ashina (Chinese: 阿史那; pinyin: Āshǐnà; Wade–Giles: A-shih-na; Middle Chinese: (Guangyun) [ʔɑʃi̯ə˥nɑ˩]) were a Turkic lineage and the ruling dynasty of the Göktürks. They rose to prominence in the mid-6th century when the leader, Bumin Qaghan (died 552), revolted against the Rouran Khaganate. The two main branches of the family, one descended from Bumin and the other from his brother Istämi, ruled over the eastern and western parts of the Göktürk empire, respectively, forming the First Turkic Khaganate (552–603).

== Origin ==
Primary Chinese sources ascribed different origins to the Ashina tribe. They were first attested to 439, as reported by the Book of Sui: on the 18th day of the 10th month, the Tuoba ruler Emperor Taiwu of Northern Wei overthrew Juqu Mujian of the Northern Liang in eastern Gansu, and 500 Ashina families fled northwest to the Rouran Khaganate near Gaochang.

According to the Book of Zhou, History of the Northern Dynasties, and the New Book of Tang, the Ashina clan was a component of the Xiongnu confederation, but this is contested. The Göktürks were also posited as having originated from an obscure Suo state (索國), north of the Xiongnu. According to the Book of Sui and the Tongdian, they were "mixed barbarians" (雜胡; záhú) from Pingliang.

According to some researchers (Duan, Xue, Tang, and Lung) the Ashina tribe descended from the Tiele confederation, who were likewise associated with the Xiongnu. Like the Göktürks, the Tiele were a Turkic tribal confederation on the steppe. However, Lee & Kuang (2017) state that Chinese histories did not describe the Ashina-led Göktürks as descending from the Dingling or belonging to the Tiele confederation. The name "Ashina" was recorded in ancient Muslim chronicles in these forms: Aś(i)nas (al-Tabari), Ānsa (Hudud al-'Alam), Śaba (Ibn Khordadbeh), Śana, Śaya (Al-Masudi).

=== Etymology ===
==== Indo-European ====
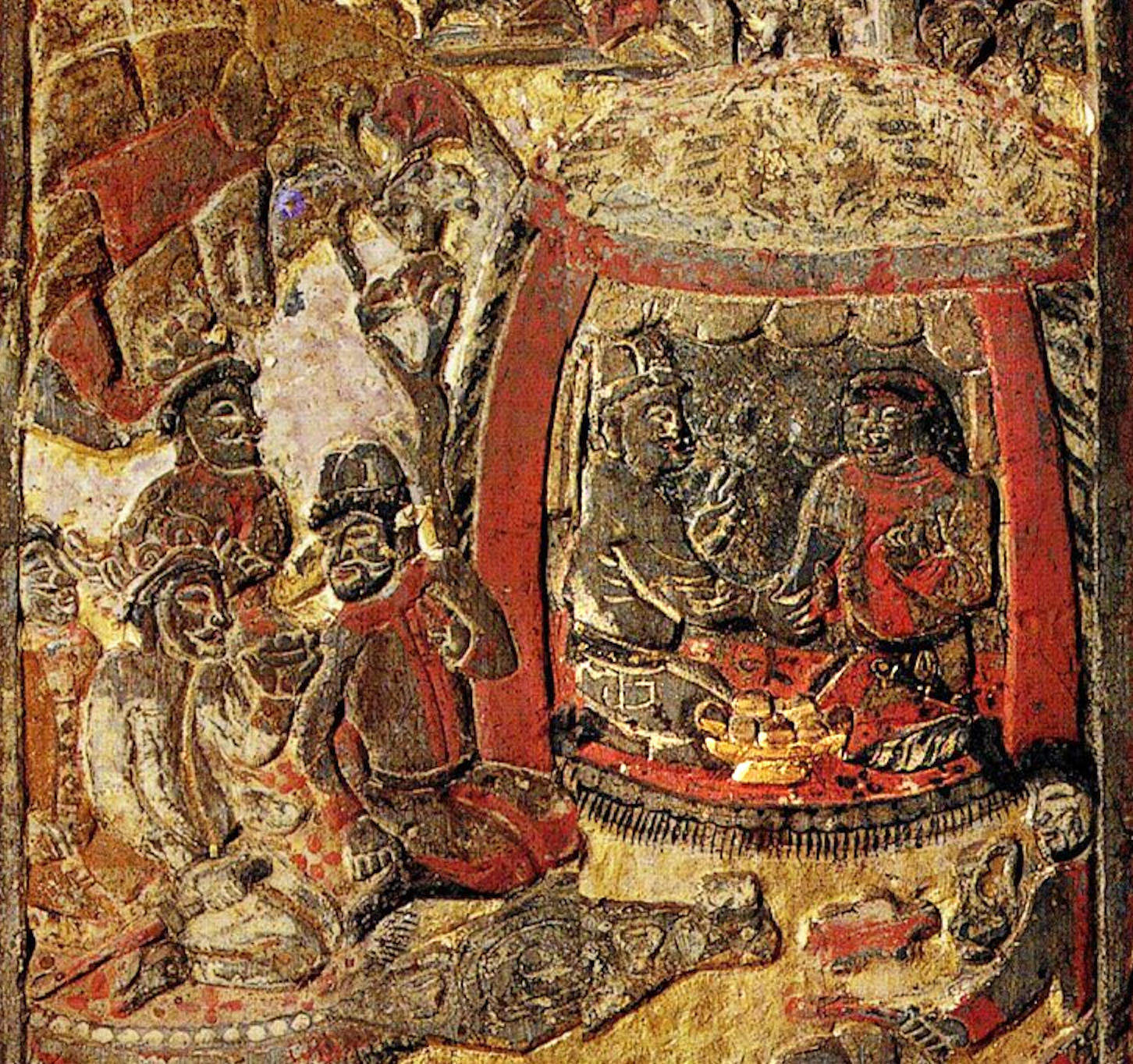
The Sogdian merchant An Jia conversing with a Turkic noble in his yurt (579 AD).

Several researchers, including Peter B. Golden, H. W. Haussig, S. G. Klyashtorny, Carter V. Findley, D. G. Savinov, B. A. Muratov,S. P. Guschin, and András Róna-Tas have posited that the term Ashina ultimately descends from an Indo-European root, possibly Tocharian or one of Eastern Iranic languages, such as the Saka. Jonathan Ratcliffe also supports this theory.

Carter V. Findley assumes that the name "Ashina" comes from one of the Saka languages of central Asia and means "blue" (which translates to Proto-Turkic *kȫk, whence Old Turkic 𐰚𐰇𐰚 kök, and same in all Modern Turkic languages). The color blue is identified with the east, so that Göktürk, another name for the Turkic empire, meant the "Turks of the East"; meanwhile, Peter Benjamin Golden favours a more limited denotation of Göktürks as denoting only the Eastern Turks. Findley also said that the term böri, used to identify the ruler's retinue as 'wolves', probably also derived from one of the Iranian languages.However etymological and historical analysis from the Orkhon inscriptions indicates that it signifies "Celestial" or "Sky" not blue. This cosmic meaning is directly mirrored in the phrase "Kök Tengri", which does not denote a "blue god" but rather the supreme "Sky God" or "Heavenly Deity" from whom the Khagans claimed their divine mandate to rule

H. W. Haussig and S. G. Kljyashtorny suggest an association between the name and the compound "kindred of Ashin" ahşaẽna (in Old Persian). This is so even in East Turkestan; then the desired form would be in the Sogdian 'xs' yn' k (-әhšēnē) "blue, dark"; Khotan-Saka (Brahmi) āşşeiņa (-āşşena) "blue", where a long -ā- emerged as development ahş-> āşş-; in Tocharian A āśna- "blue, dark" (from Khotan-Saka and Sogdian). There is textual support for either of these versions in the Göktürk Orkhon inscriptions, in which the Göktürks are described as the "Blue Turks"; being descended from the marriage between Blue Sky and the Brown Earth.

According to Kuastornyj, the perfect translation of "Ashina" as an Indo-European word meaning "blue" indicates that the Türks of the First Turkic Khaganate period may aware of the non-Türkic origin of the name "Ashina." In this hypothesis of Louis Bazin, this knowledge was being suppressed in the Second Turkic Khaganate period by the Türkic nationalist policies of Bilge Qaghan.

==== Turkic or East Asian ====
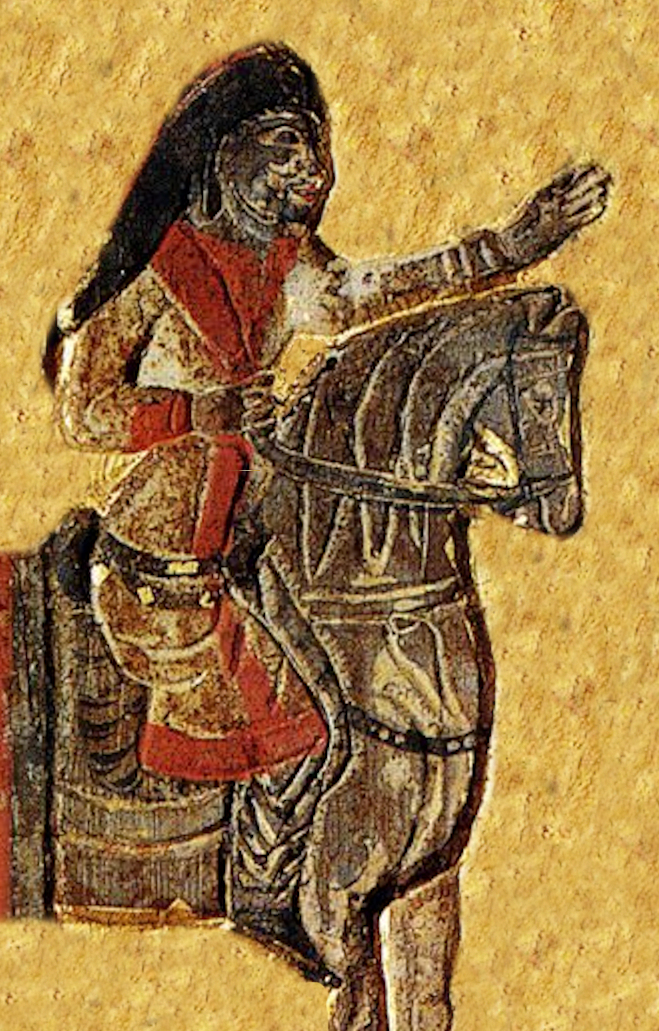
Turkic horseman (Tomb of An Jia, 579 AD).

Peter A. Boodberg reconstructs the Chinese transcription 阿史那's Middle Chinese pronunciation as *’âṣinâ, which he derives from Turkic *ašïn, further from Proto-Turkic root *aš- ("to cross a mountain"), (Note: Amended to *aş- "to cross [a mountain]" in Çalışkan (2018)) referring to the origin legend wherein the wolf-descended Turks had to cross mountains. Boodberg additionally derives the Middle Chinese transcription 阿史那 *’âṣitək (whence standard Chinese Āshǐdé) from this same root *aš-, immediately through *aşıd-.

Japanese Sinologist and historian Kurakichi Shiratori suggested that Ashina comes from *Esh- in Proto-Turkic. Christopher I. Beckwith reads the word Ashina as a Turkic name Arslan, based on Byzantine historian Menander Protector's record that “the name of the earliest rulers of the Turks was Arsilas” meaning that Ashina may have been an earlier form or a Chinese corrupted form of Arslan.

Based on Chinese sources' testament that the Ashina, upon becoming the head of Turks, exhibited a tuğ banner with a wolf head over their gate in reminiscence of its origins, the name "Ashina" is translated by Boodberg as "wolf", cf. Tuoba 叱奴 *čino, Middle Mongol činua, Khalkha čono. Gumilev, on the other hand, considered 阿 (A) as a prefix, a respect marker placed before a name, and accepted 'shih-na' as činua, just as Boodberg did; thus, he concluded that A-shih-na means "noble wolf." Nevertheless, Golden contends that derivation from Mongolic is mistaken.

On the Khor-Asgat inscription, the form Ašїnas is written and is similar to the Sogdian form Ašinas from the Bugut and Karabalgasun steles and the Arabic forms Ašinās and Ašnās from medieval Islamic sources. Reasoning that Chinese editors usually avoided the coda /-s/, Takashi Ōsawa hypothetically derives the family name Ašїnas from their tribal ancestress's name *A-ši-na (Note: Ōsawa's hypothetical reconstruction; the Göktürks' ancestress was unnamed in Chinese sources) and the final element -as, which he explains as a plural suffix (similar to the Turkic Käŋäräs < Käŋär "(Kangar / Kangly)" + suffix -(ä)s) as proposed by Marquart, Melioranskii and others.

He further links *A-ši-na to the Xiongnu title 閼氏, which was pronounced *′ât-zie in Late Middle Chinese, (Note: Pulleyblank (1962) attempted to link the Xiongnu title 閼氏 < *ɑt-tēh to Proto-Mongolic *qati (whence also *qači- > *qačun > Turkic qatun / xatun); however, Vovin (2002) proposed that Old Chinese 閼氏 *ɑt-tej ~ *en-tej transcribed Xiongnu form *ɑlte ~ *elte, which Vovin compared to Kott alit "wife", ali:t, alat "woman", Assan alit "wife", Arin biqam-álte, kekm-elte "wife", all from Proto-Yeniseian *ʔalit ~ *ʔar_{1}it "woman") meant "wife of a ruler", and might be derived from *aš / eš, *azhi / *ezhi < *ašïn / *ešin, and *azhïn / *ezhin, further from Tungusic *Aši < *asun / *asi < *hasun < *khasu < *kasun < *katsun and Turko-Mongolic *Ači < ačun < *hatun < khatun < katun. (Note: The title Khatun is proposed to be a loanword from Sogdian xwt'yn (xwatēn).)

=== Legends ===
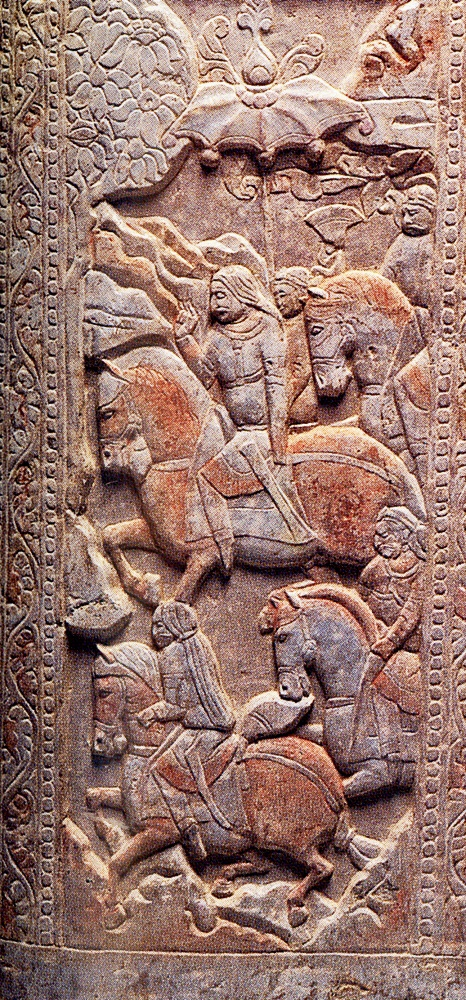
Turkic horsemen with long hair on the Miho funerary couch. Circa 570 AD. Northern Dynasties, China.

Chinese chroniclers recorded four origin tales, which Golden termed "Wolf Tale I", "Wolf Tale II", "Shemo (Žama) and the Deer Tale" and "Historical Account", of the Turks in dynasty histories and historical compilations "based on or copied from the same source(s) and repeated in later collections of historical tales".

- Wolf Tale I: Ashina was one of ten sons born to a grey she-wolf (see: Asena) in the north of Gaochang.
- Wolf Tale II: The ancestor of the Ashina was a man from the Suo nation (north of Xiongnu) whose mother was a lupine season goddess.
- Shemo and the Deer Tale: The Ashina descended from a skilled archer named Shemo, who had once fallen in love with a sea goddess west of Ashide cave.
- Historical Account: The Ashina were mixture stocks from the Pingliang commandery of eastern Gansu.

These stories were sometimes pieced together to form a chronologically coherent narrative of early Ashina history. However, as the Book of Zhou, the Book of Sui, and the Youyang Zazu were all written around the same time, during the early Tang dynasty, it is debatable whether they could truly be considered chronological or rather should be considered competing versions of the Ashina's origin.

The record of Turks in Zhoushu (written in the first half of the seventh century) describes the use of gold by Turks around the mid-fifth century:

"(The Turks) put gold sculpture of wolf head on their tuğ banner; their military men were called Fuli, that is, wolf in Chinese. It is because they are descendants of the wolf, and naming so is for not forgetting their ancestors."

According to Klyashtorny, the origin myth of Ashina shared similarities with the Wusun, although there is a significant difference that, whereas in the Wusun myth the wolf saves the ancestor of the tribe, it is not as in the case of the Turks. He also adds that Turk system of beliefs linking at least some sections of the Turk ruling class to the Sogdians and, beyond them, to the Wusun.

== Funeral rite ==
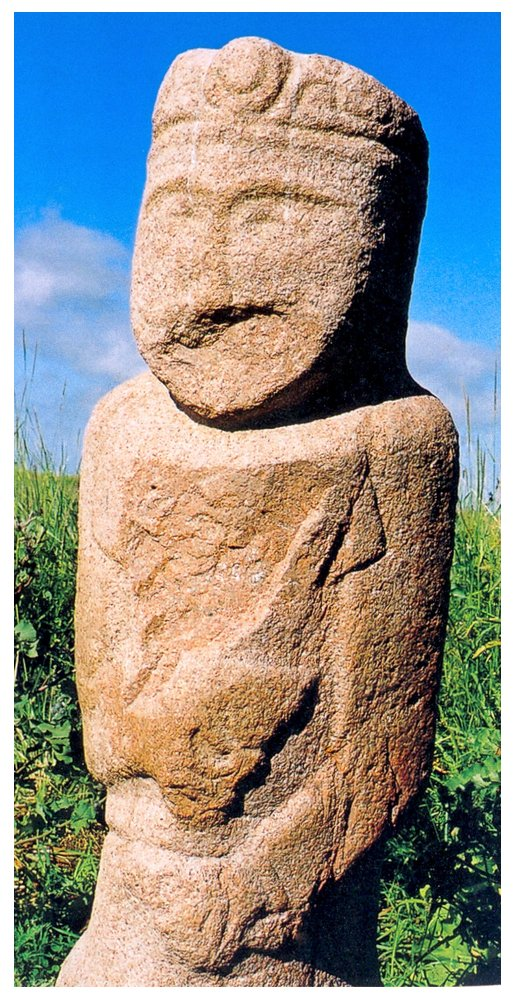
Statue of Niri Qaghan, Xinjiang, China

The Chronicle of Northern Zhou describes the funeral rites of the Ashina. The deceased were laid to rest in a tent, and animals would be sacrificed around the tent. Relatives of the deceased would ride horses around the tent and ritualistically cut themselves about the face as a display of mourning, or "blood tears". The individual and their belongings would then be incinerated.

According to D. G. Savinov, no burials have been found in South Siberia nor Central Asia that are fully consistent with the description of Ashina burials. According to Savinov this may be for several reasons:

1. Göktürk burial sites in Central Asia and Southern Siberia are not yet open;
2. The source is a compilation in character, and burial rituals and funeral cycle from various sources are listed in a unified manner;
3. Göktürk funeral rites in the form in which they are recorded in written sources, developed later on the basis of the various components present in some of the archaeological sites of Southern Siberia of earlier Turkic cultures.

While Chinese chronicles describe the practice of cremation among the Göktürks, archaeological evidence from Central Asia and Southern Siberia overwhelmingly points to inhumation (burial with a horse) among the general population. Archaeologist D. G. Savinov suggests that cremation was likely a regulated ritual limited to a socially privileged elite, or that the written accounts combined various regional customs from different periods

== Physical appearance ==
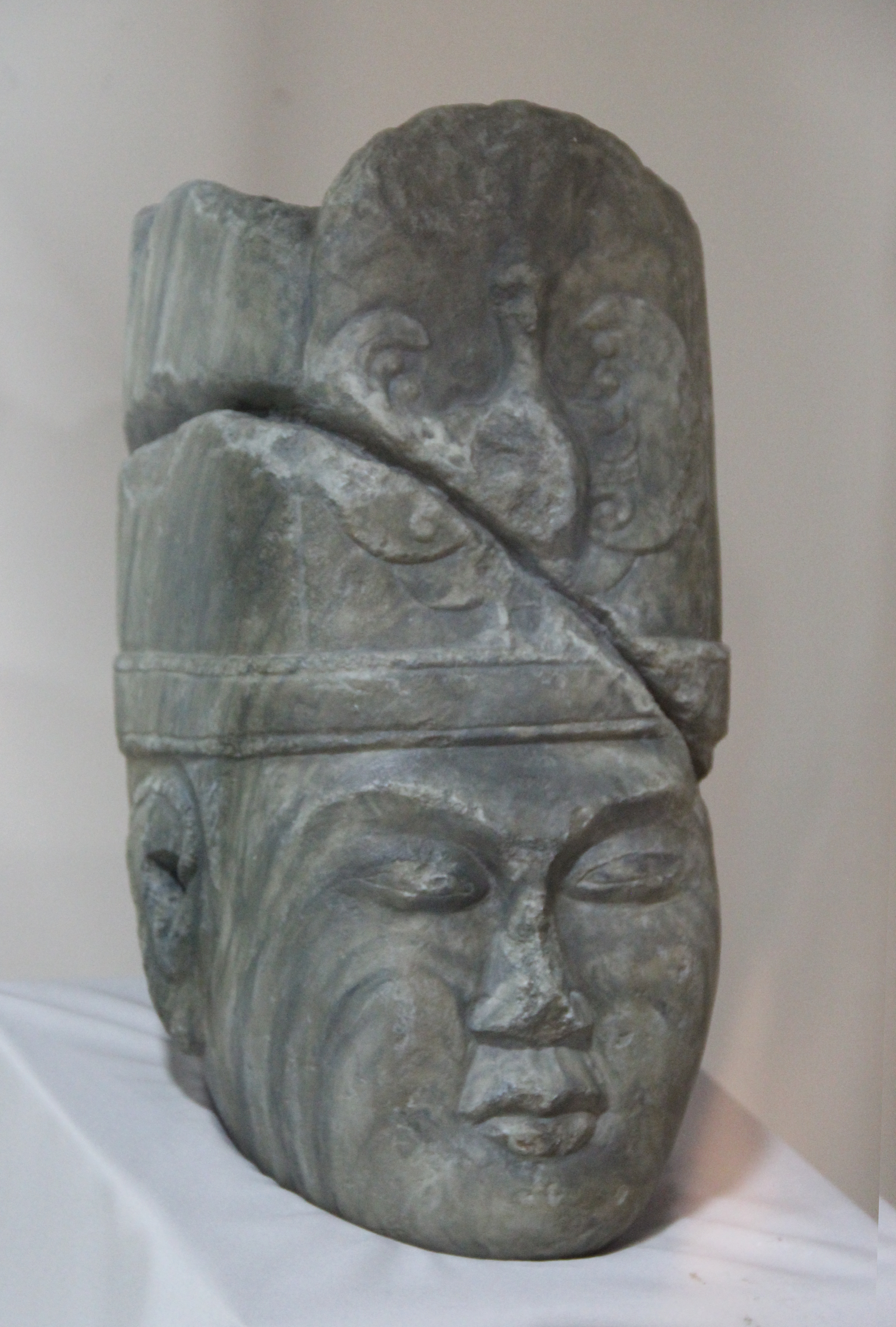
Bust of Kul Tigin (684–731), an Ashina Prince.

According to the Book of Zhou and the History of the Northern Dynasties, the Ashina clan was related to the "Yenisei Kyrgyz", (Note: For an English translation, see Golden (2018:300-304)) (Note: However, Duan Chengshi wrote in Miscellaneous Morsels from Youyang that the mythological ancestors of Kyrgyz tribe (Jiānkūn bùluò 堅昆部落) were "a god and a cow" (神與牸牛), (unlike Göktürks, whose mythological ancestress was a she-wolf).) who resided near the Pamir mountains and are described as possessing red hair and blue eyes in the New Book of Tang (Xin Tangshu 217b.6147), a description previously used to describe the Wusun. However according to Lee & Kuang (2017), the Göktürks differed from the Kyrgyz in their physiognomy and "no comparable depiction of the Kök Türks or Tiele is found in the official Chinese histories."

Lee & Kuang state that the most likely explanation for the West Eurasian physiognomy of the Yenisei Kyrgyz is a high frequency of the Eurasian Indo-European haplogroup R1a-Z93. Today, predominantly Asian Turkic groups such as Kyrgyz, a descendant of the Yenisei Kirghiz have one of the highest frequencies of R1a, with over 63% of the population while R1a-Z93 is most common (>30%) in the Altai people in Russia.

The Chinese Buddhist pilgrim Xuanzang visited the western Göktürk capital Suyab in modern-day Kyrgyzstan and left a description of the Ashina Tong:

The khan wore a green satin robe; his hair, which was ten feet long, was free. A band of white silk wound round his forehead and hung down behind. The ministers of the presence, numbering two hundred in number, all wearing embroidered robes, stood on his right and left. The rest of his military retinue [was] clothed in fur, serge and fine wool, the spears and standards and bows in order, and the riders of camels and horses stretched far out of [sight].

20th-century Chinese historian Xue Zongzheng claimed original Ashina members had physical features similar to Sogdians was by the time of Qilibi Khan, (Note: Simo was described as having a physical appearance similar to that of a Sogdian (original Chinese: 胡人 húrén "non-Chinese peoples of the North or West, barbarian, > Iranian > Sogdian") and so was suspected by the Ashina khagans Shibi and Chuluo of being born out of an adulterous relationship, and therefore was not entrusted with great authorities, like commanding the army as a shad.) an eighth generation descendant of Bumin Qaghan, presented as a sign of mixed ancestry among the Ashina.

However, both Shibi Khan (609–619 AD) and Heshana Qaghan (604–612 AD) were doubtful of Qilibi being Ashina because he resembled a Sogdian more than a Göktürk which prevented him from being a shad.

This hypothesis was not supported by general consensus. DNA studies on early members of the Ashina family revealed that they were exclusively East Asian. Muqan Qaghan, the third qaghan of the First Turkic Khaganate, was described by Chinese authors as having an unusual appearance. He had eyes like "colored glazes", he had a very red complexion, and his face was over a foot wide.

== Genetics ==
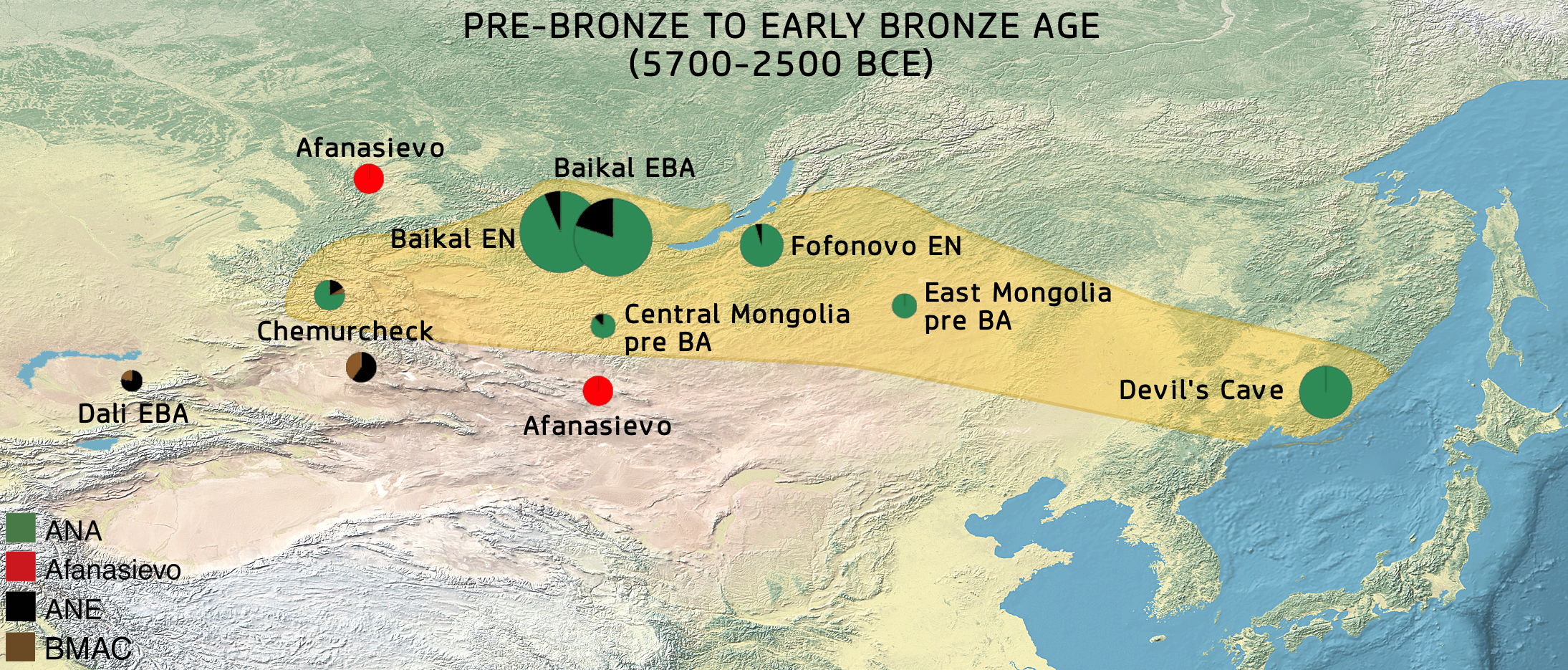
Empress Ashina (551–582), an early royal Ashina member and immediate descendant of the founding Göktürk khagans, belonged genetically to the Ancient Northeast Asians (ANA, yellow area), supporting the Northeast Asian origin of the Ashina tribe and the Gökturks.

In 2023 the first genetic analysis on an early royal Ashina member (Empress Ashina, the daughter of Muqan Qaghan) found nearly exclusively Northeast Asian ancestry (97.7%) next to a minor West-Eurasian component (2.3%). The West-Eurasian component corresponded to a single mixture event dating to around 1566 ± 396 years before Ashina's lifetime (dating to c. 1000 BC).

It was determined that Empress Ashina belonged to the North-East Asian mtDNA haplogroup F1d. The Ashina individual was found to be genetically closer to East Asians than modern Central Asian Turkic groups. However, East Asian Turkic groups such as Dolgan, Salar, Tuvan, Yakut, Chuvash Altaian, Altaian-Chelkan, Khakass, Kazakh-China, Kyrgyz-China showed genetic affinity with Ashina. The Ashina individual was genetically closest to post-Iron Age Tungusic and Mongolic Steppe pastoralists, supporting the near-exclusively Northeast Asian origin of the Ashina tribe and early Turkic populations.

The ancient Türkic royal family of the Göktürks was found to share genetic affinities to post-Iron Age Tungusic and Mongolic pastoralists, while having heterogeneous relationships towards various later Turkic-speaking groups, suggesting genetic heterogeneity and multiple sources of origin for the later populations of the Turkic empire. This shows that the Ashina lineage had a dominating contribution on Mongolic and Tungusic speakers but limited contribution on Turkic-speaking populations. According to the authors of the 2023 study, these findings "once again validates a cultural diffusion model over a demic diffusion model for the spread of Turkic languages" and refutes "the western Eurasian origin and multiple origin hypotheses" in favor of an East Asian origin for the royal Ashina family.

== Legacy ==
Members of the Ashina dynasty also ruled the Basmyls, and Karluk Yabghu's State; and possibly also Khazars and Karakhanids (if the first Karakhanid ruler Bilge Kul Qadir Khan indeed descended from the Karluk Yabghus). According to some researchers, the Second Bulgarian Empire's Asen dynasty might be descendants of Ashina.

== Gallery ==
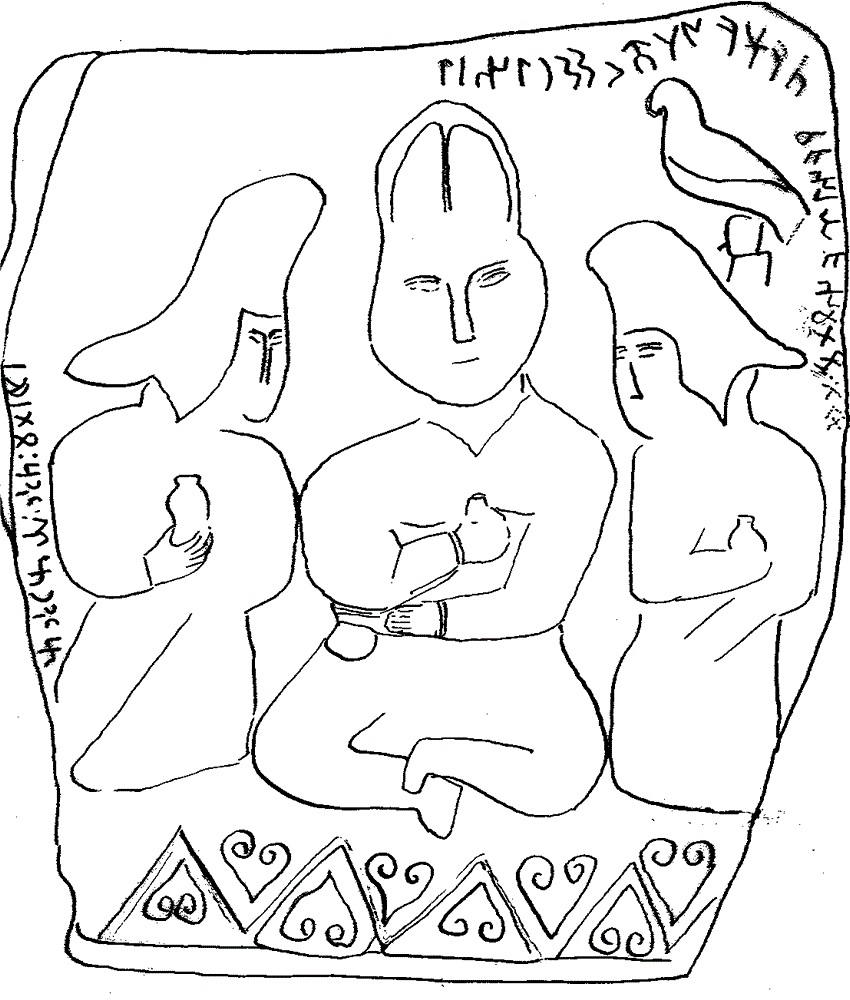
Memorial complex of Altyn Tamgan Tarhan, (son of Ashina Duoxifu) 732 AD. Ibex Tamga can be seen. Bulgan Province, Mongolia

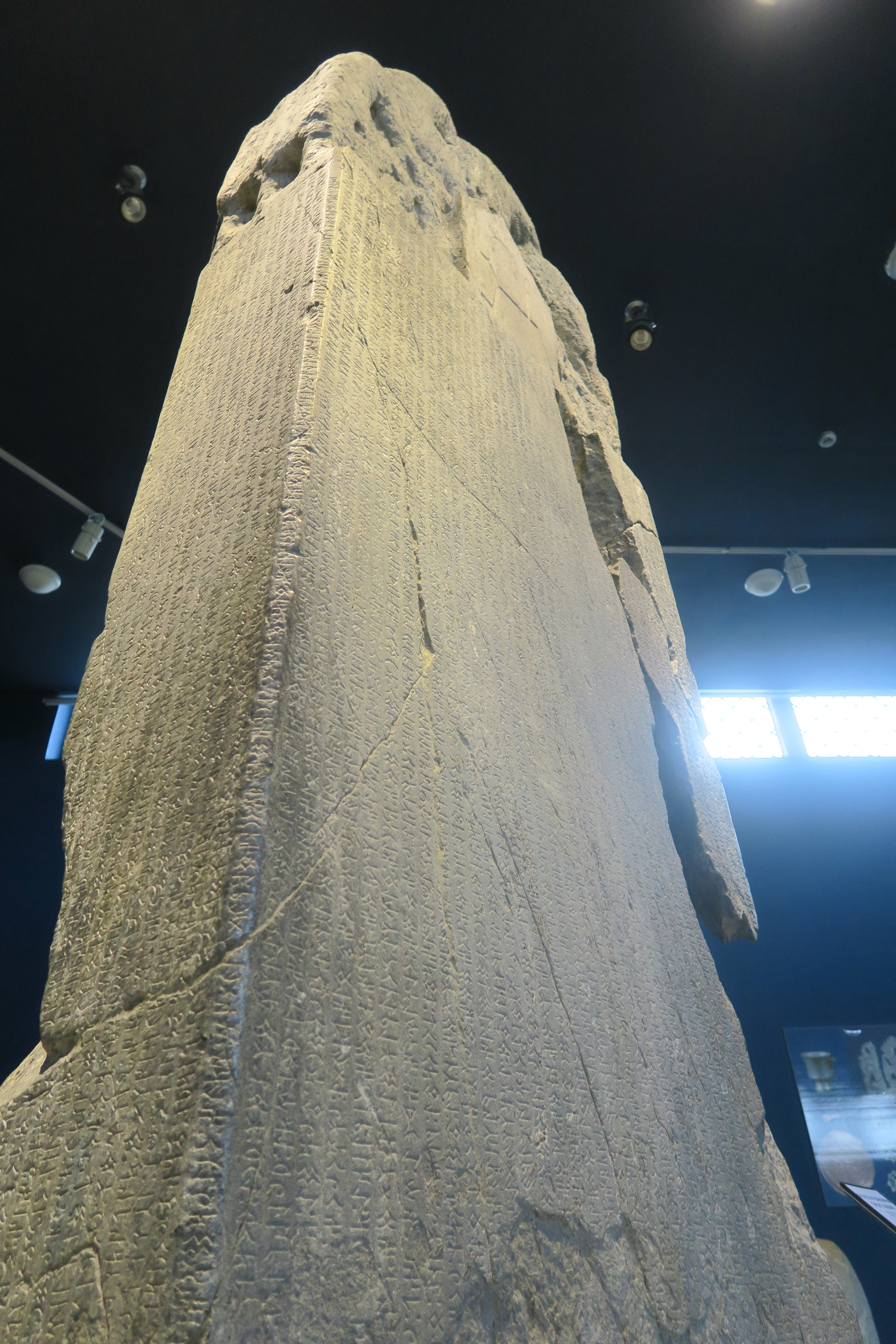
Kul Tigin inscription, Mongolia.

== See also ==
- Timeline of Turks (500–1300)
- Turks in the Tang military
- Mythology of the Turkic and Mongolian peoples
- Shǐ (surname), (史) adopted by some of the Ashina tribe

== Sources ==
- Brook, Kevin Alan (2018). The Jews of Khazaria. Rowman & Littlefield.
- Cheng, Fangyi. "The Research on the Identification Between Tiele and the Oghuric Tribes".
- Christian, David (1998). A history of Russia, Central Asia and Mongolia, Vol. 1: Inner Eurasia from prehistory to the Mongol Empire. Blackwell.
- Duan: Dingling, Gaoju and Tiele. 1988, pp. 39–41
- Findley, Carter Vaughin. The Turks in World History. Oxford University Press, 2005. ISBN 0-19-517726-6.
- Golden, Peter. An introduction to the history of the Turkic peoples: Ethnogenesis and state-formation in medieval and early modern Eurasia and the Middle East, Harrassowitz, 1992.
- Grousset, René (1970). The Empire of the Steppes: A History of Central Asia. Rutgers University Press. ISBN 978-0-8135-1304-1.
- "Klyashtorny, Sergei. "Орхонские тюрки" ("Orhon Turks")". The Great Soviet Encyclopedia 2nd ed. Soviet Encyclopedia, 1950–1958.
- Lee, Joo-Yup; Kuang, Shuntu (18 October 2017). "A Comparative Analysis of Chinese Historical Sources and y-dna Studies with Regard to the Early and Medieval Turkic Peoples". Inner Asia. 19 (2): 197–239. doi:10.1163/22105018-12340089. ISSN 2210-5018. S2CID 165623743.
- Róna-Tas, András. Hungarians and Europe in the Early Middle Ages. Central European University Press, 1999. ISBN 963-9116-48-3. Page 280.
- Sinor, Denis; Klyashtorny, S. G. (1 January 1996). "The Türk Empire". In Litvinsky, B. A. (ed.). History of Civilizations of Central Asia: The crossroads of civilizations, A.D. 250 to 750. UNESCO. pp. 327–346. ISBN 9231032119.
- Skaff, Jonathan Karem (2009). Nicola Di Cosmo (ed.). Military Culture in Imperial China. Harvard University Press. ISBN 978-0-674-03109-8.
- Suribadalaha, "New Studies of the Origins of the Mongols", p. 46–47.
- Underhill, Peter A.; et al. (26 March 2014). "The phylogenetic and geographic structure of Y-chromosome haplogroup R1a". European Journal of Human Genetics. 23 (1): 124–131. doi:10.1038/ejhg.2014.50. PMC 4266736. PMID 24667786. "PDF" (PDF). Archived from the original (PDF) on 16 August 2016.
- Xue, Zongzheng. A History of Turks. Beijing: Chinese Social Sciences Press, 1992. ISBN 7-5004-0432-8.
- Zhu, Xueyuan. The Origins of Northern China's Ethnicities. Beijing: Zhonghua Shuju, 2004. ISBN 7-101-03336-9.
- Pearson, Roger (1985). Anthropological glossary. R. E. Krieger Pub. Co. p. 79. ISBN 9780898745108.
- Templeton, A. (2016). "Evolution and Notions of Human Race". In Losos, J.; Lenski, R. (eds.). How Evolution Shapes Our Lives: Essays on Biology and Society. Princeton; Oxford: Princeton University Press. pp. 346–361. doi:10.2307/j.ctv7h0s6j.26. "... the answer to the question whether races exist in humans is clear and unambiguous: no."
- Wagner, Jennifer K.; Yu, Joon-Ho; Ifekwunigwe, Jayne O.; Harrell, Tanya M.; Bamshad, Michael J.; Royal, Charmaine D. (February 2017). "Anthropologists' views on race, ancestry, and genetics". American Journal of Physical Anthropology. 162 (2): 318–327. Bibcode:2017AJPA..162..318W. doi:10.1002/ajpa.23120. PMC 5299519. PMID 27874171.
- American Association of Physical Anthropologists (27 March 2019). "AAPA Statement on Race and Racism". American Association of Physical Anthropologists.
- Pickering, Robert (2009). The Use of Forensic Anthropology. CRC Press. p. 82. ISBN 978-1-4200-6877-1.
- Herbst, Philip (15 June 1997). The color of words: an encyclopaedic dictionary of ethnic bias in the United States. Intercultural Press. ISBN 978-1-877864-97-1. "Though discredited as an anthropological term and not recommended in most editorial guidelines, it is still heard and used, for example, as a category on forms asking for ethnic identification. It is also still used for police blotters (the abbreviated Cauc may be heard among police) and appears elsewhere as a euphemism. Its synonym, Caucasoid, also once used in anthropology but now dated and considered pejorative, is disappearing."
- Mukhopadhyay, Carol C. (30 June 2008). "Getting Rid of the Word 'Caucasian'". In Mica Pollock (ed.). Everyday Antiracism: Getting Real About Race in School. New Press. pp. 14–. ISBN 978-1-59558-567-7. "Yet there is one striking exception in our modern racial vocabulary: the term 'Caucasian'. Despite being a remnant of a discredited theory of racial classification, the term has persisted into the twenty-first century, within as well as outside of the educational community. It is high time we got rid of the word Caucasian. Some might protest that it is 'only a label'. But language is one of the most systematic, subtle, and significant vehicles for transmitting racial ideology. Terms that describe imagined groups, such as Caucasian, encapsulate those beliefs. Every time we use them and uncritically expose students to them, we are reinforcing rather than dismantling the old racialized worldview. Using the word Caucasian invokes scientific racism, the false idea that races are naturally occurring, biologically ranked subdivisions of the human species and that Caucasians are the superior race. Beyond this, the label Caucasian can even convey messages about which groups have culture and are entitled to recognition as Americans."
