= 645 =

Calendar year

645 in various calendars
- Gregorian calendar: 645; DCXLV
- Ab urbe condita: 1398
- Armenian calendar: 94; ԹՎ ՂԴ
- Assyrian calendar: 5395
- Balinese saka calendar: 566–567
- Bengali calendar: 51–52
- Berber calendar: 1595
- Buddhist calendar: 1189
- Burmese calendar: 7
- Byzantine calendar: 6153–6154
- Chinese calendar: 甲辰年 (Wood Dragon); 3342 or 3135 — to — 乙巳年 (Wood Snake); 3343 or 3136
- Coptic calendar: 361–362
- Discordian calendar: 1811
- Ethiopian calendar: 637–638
- Hebrew calendar: 4405–4406
- Hindu calendars
- Vikram Samvat: 701–702
- Shaka Samvat: 566–567
- Kali Yuga: 3745–3746
- Holocene calendar: 10645
- Iranian calendar: 23–24
- Islamic calendar: 24–25
- Japanese calendar: Taika 1 (大化元年)
- Javanese calendar: 536–537
- Julian calendar: 645; DCXLV
- Korean calendar: 2978
- Minguo calendar: 1267 before ROC 民前1267年
- Nanakshahi calendar: −823
- Seleucid era: 956/957 AG
- Thai solar calendar: 1187–1188
- Tibetan calendar: ཤིང་ཕོ་འབྲུག་ལོ་ (male Wood-Dragon); 771 or 390 or −382 — to — ཤིང་མོ་སྦྲུལ་ལོ་ (female Wood-Snake); 772 or 391 or −381

Xuanzang (c. 602–664)

Year 645 (DCXLV) was a common year starting on Saturday of the Julian calendar. The denomination 645 for this year has been used since the early medieval period, when the Anno Domini calendar era became the prevalent method in Europe for naming years.

== Events ==
=== By place ===
==== Byzantine Empire ====
- Alexandria revolts against Arab rule, at the appearance of a Byzantine fleet of 300 ships, and Byzantine forces recapture the city. Abdullah ibn Sa'ad, Arab governor of Egypt, mounts an assault and retakes it. He begins building a Muslim fleet.

==== Europe ====
- Plato, exarch (imperial governor) of Ravenna, invades the southern Po Valley. The Lombards under King Rothari defeat him on the banks of the Panaro River (near Modena); 8,000 imperial troops are killed.

==== Britain ====
- King Cenwalh of Wessex is driven from his kingdom by his brother-in-law, King Penda of Mercia (according to Bede). He flees to the court of king Anna of East Anglia, and is baptised while in exile. Penda overruns Wessex.
- Gwynedd and much of Wales is in the grasp of famine. Would-be king Cadwaladr Fendigaid flees to Brittany. Civil war continues in his kingdom (approximate date).

==== Japan ====
- July 10 – Isshi Incident: Prince Naka-no-Ōe and Fujiwara no Kamatari assassinate Soga no Iruka, during a coup d'état at the imperial palace.
- Empress Kōgyoku is forced to abdicate the throne in favor of her younger brother Kōtoku, age 49, who becomes the 36th emperor of Japan.
- Naka-no-Ōe becomes crown prince and prime minister. Supporters of the semi-legendary regent Prince Shōtoku gain supremacy in Japan.
- Kōtoku creates a new city at Naniwa, and moves the capital from Yamato Province. The capital has a sea port, establishing foreign trade and diplomatic relations.
- Emperor Kōtoku establishes the Taika Reform: a land reform based on Confucian ideas and philosophies from China (approximate date)
- The first nengō, derived from the Chinese system of eras (nianhao) begins with the Taika era. ^{(Unclear significance. Needs more explanation as to why this belongs in the list of major events of the year)}

==== China ====
- May 1 – First conflict of the Goguryeo–Tang War: A Chinese expeditionary army under Emperor Taizong of Tang crosses the Liao River into Goguryeo (one of the Three kingdoms of Korea).
- July 18 – Tang forces under Li Shiji heading southeast toward the Yalu River put the strategic fortress of Ansi City (in the province of Liaoning) under siege.
- September – Taizong is unable to capture the Ansi fortress defended by Korean general Yang Manch'un. Food supplies running low, he withdraws his forces, ending the Siege of Ansi.
- October 13 – Emperor Taizong is compelled to order a withdrawal from Goguryeo.

=== By topic ===
==== Religion ====
- Xuanzang, Chinese Buddhist monk, returns to China after a 16-year pilgrimage to India. He is greeted with much honor by Emperor Taizong.
- The Giant Wild Goose Pagoda at Ci'en Temple, Xi'an (Shanxi) is first erected during the Tang dynasty (approximate date).

== Births ==
- Æthelred, king of Mercia (approximate date)
- Ecgfrith, king of Northumbria (approximate date)
- Jitō, empress of Japan (d. 703)
- John of Damascus, Syrian church father (or 676)
- Mujahid ibn Jabr, Arabic scholar (or 642)
- Yazid I, Muslim Caliph (d. 683)

== Deaths ==
- April 26 – Richarius, Frankish hermit and monk
- July 10 – Soga no Iruka, statesman of Japan
- October 21 – Zhenzhu Khan, khan of Xueyantuo
- unknown dates
  - Al-Khansa, Arabic poet (b. 575)
  - Cen Wenben, chancellor and editor of the Book of Zhou (b. 595)
  - Li Chengqian, crown prince of the Tang dynasty
  - Soga no Emishi, statesman of Japan (b. 587)
  - Yan Shigu, Chinese author of the Tang dynasty (b. 581)
