= Yanzhou (disambiguation) =

Yanzhou may refer to:

Modern places

- Yanzhou, the current Yanzhou District (兖州区) of Jining prefecture-level city, it is also the Yanzhou City (兖州市), a historic county-level city of Shandong province.
- Yanzhou Town (烟洲镇), a town of Changning City, Hunan.

Historic places

- Yanzhou or Yan Province (兗州), one of Nine Provinces (九州) in ancient China.
- Yanzhou Prefecture (严州府), a historic prefecture of Zhejiang province.
- Yanzhou Village or Yanzhou City (燕州城), a city-fortress first established by Goguryeo in present day Dengta, Liaoyang.

Also see the current Yangzhou, a prefecture-level city of Jiangsu province.
