= Battle of Mount Jupil =

645 Goguryeo–Tang battle

- Part of the First campaign in the Goguryeo–Tang War
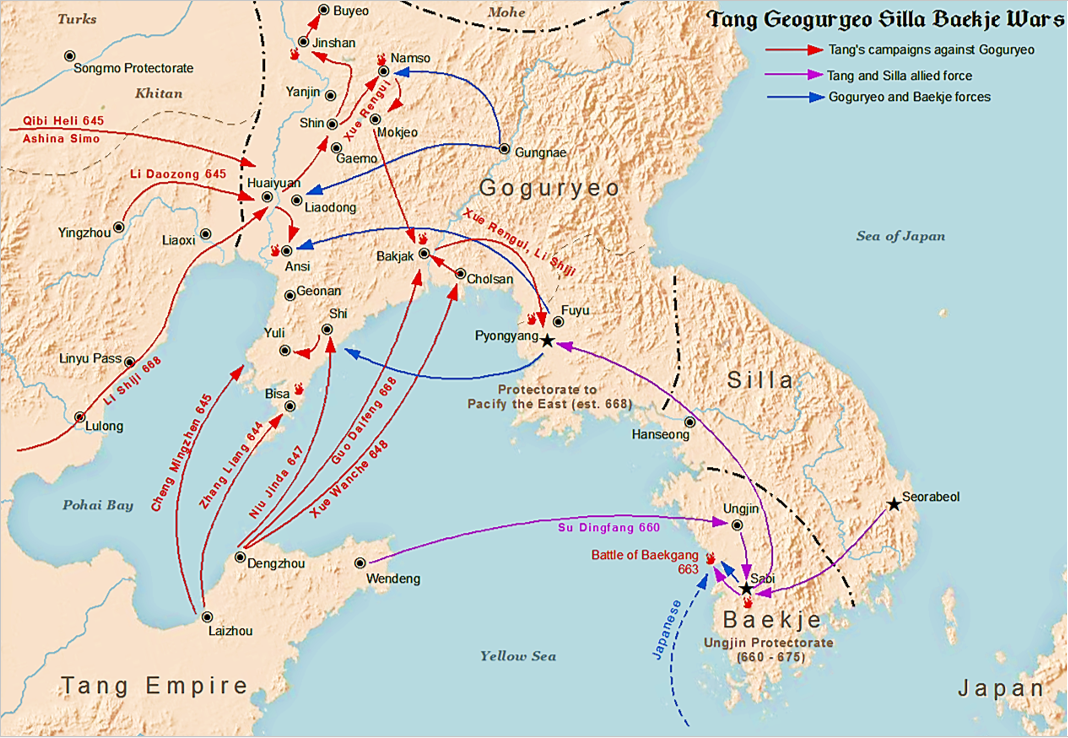
- Map showing the invasion of Goguryeo by the Tang forces from 645 to 668 AD
Date	June 23, 645 AD
Location	Near the fortress city of Ansi, northern Goguryeo (present-day Haicheng, Liaoning Province, China)
Result	Tang victory

Belligerents
Tang dynasty	Goguryeo; Mohe

Commanders and leaders
Taizong of Tang (Emperor of China); Li Daozong (Imperial Prince of China); Zhangsun Wuji (Duke of Zhao); Qibi Heli (Duke of Liangguo); General Li Shiji; General Yuchi Jingde; General Xue Rengui; General Ashina She'er; General Qilibi Khan (WIA)	Yŏn Kaesomun (Generalissimo of Goguryeo); General Ko Hyejin (POW); General Ko Yŏnsu (POW)

Strength
Unknown	150,000 soldiers

Casualties and losses
Unknown, but light	Entire force dispersed and destroyed 36,800 surrendered

The Battle of Mount Jupil, also known as Battle of Jupil-san (Korean: 주필산_전투 Jupil-san Jeontu) and Battle of Mount Zhubi (Chinese: 驻跸山之战 Zhūbìshān Zhīzhàn) was a battle between Tang Chinese and Goguryeo Korean forces that took place in Mount Jupil at the south of the fortress city of Ansi. It took place on July 11, 645 AD. The small but elite Tang army wiped out the Goguryeo relief force trying to come to bolster the defenses of Ansi, achieving a major victory.

== Background ==
The Emperor of China, Taizong of Tang, decided to invade Goguryeo Korea in 644 AD. The murder of the previous king of Goguryeo, Yeongnyu of Goguryeo, and other officials by the military dictator Yŏn Kaesomun was used as the pretext for the invasion. The said officials are known to court the Emperor of China and had their kingdom on friendly terms with China, something that Yŏn Kaesomun, himself a military hardliner, never approved and hence the reason for their murder. The invasion finally commenced on 1 April 645, when Tang forces led by general Li Shiji, under orders from the Emperor, crossed into Goguryeo territory with his army. The whole endeavor was a combined naval and ground assault of Goguryeo territories north of the Yalu River, with the Goguryeo provinces of Yodong and Baegam now in danger of falling under the sway of the Tang.

Yŏn Kaesomun proceeded to mobilize an army of 150,000 soldiers led by generals Ko Hyejin and Ko Yŏnsu to bolster the northern defenses of the kingdom by June 645. The size of the army was already proportionately very huge in relation to the small population and fragile economy of the kingdom. The mobilization of such huge army took place while Tang forces marched eastwards across Goguryeo territory and taking cities one by one, in such that by 11 June they are finally at the gates of the fortress city of Ansi, the capital of Yodong province, the second-largest city in the kingdom with 100,000 inhabitants, and the locus of the northern overland Goguryeo defensive system. Should the city fall to the Chinese, the rest of Goguryeo south of the Yalu River is defenseless to invasion. The huge relief army was thus gathered at Pyongyang and then marched north and made haste in an attempt to aid the beleaguered fortress city.

== Prelude ==
Spies and mounted scouts scouring the northern part of Goguryeo reported to Emperor Taizong that a sizeable relief force from Pyongyang is on the way to prevent Ansi from falling to the Tang. This was the army that Yŏn Kaesomun sent to relieve Ansi along with its two generals. A war council was then convened thereafter with the Emperor at the head, telling his generals that earthworks needed to be made that are to be perfectly situated at steep hills surrounding Ansi to prevent any chance of escape by the defenders of the city, while the army would face the relief force and hid a small cavalry detachment led by prince Li Daozong in a hill to flank the relief force from the rear; the battle would thus be decided in a hammer and anvil fashion as the Emperor planned.

The two armies finally faced off each other at the plain situated at the foot of Mount Jupil by 21 June, with the Goguryeo army just across a river at the south end of the plain.

== Battle ==
The battle was joined on 23 June when one of the Goguryeo generals, Ko Yŏnsu, sighted that the Tang army was seemingly smaller and had its lines thinly held. With this, he decided to attack with the cavalry and attempt to dislodge the large Tang army in front of his army. What he did not know is that it was actually a ploy by the Emperor Taizong to lure the Goguryeo army into a trap as earlier planned by his subordinates. The Goguryeo cavalry led by Ko Yŏnsu charged across the plain dominating the battlefield at the foot of Jupil Mountain just south of Ansi, towards the Tang infantry that was awaiting them in a shield wall formation. The other general, Ko Hyejin, followed suit and also joined the attack. Despite mass projectile shots from archers, crossbowmen and catapults just within the Tang formation, the cavalry charge kept up its momentum until it finally impacted the shield wall, causing many Tang casualties in the process as the cavalry charged across. But it soon came as a shock for both generals that behind the long shield wall of the Tang army were massive and dense amounts of infantry with Emperor Taizong and his entourage far behind observing the scene, and yet despite it they continued the assault on the Tang army. The massive Tang battle line thus slowly developed from a straight line into a U-shaped formation as its army purposefully gave way to the Goguryeo attack, giving the Goguryeo a false sense of victory at this stage.

When Emperor Taizong finally deemed the time right to spring his trap, he ordered to sound the drums and horns to signal the flanking attack by Zhangsun Wuji and other generals with an 11,000-strong cavalry detachment from behind hidden in a hill north of Mount Jupil until now. In what seemed to be a Cannae-like event, the Tang cavalry finally closed in into the rear of the Goguryeo cavalry, hitting it through its rear. The Tang army started pushing and tightening the encirclement even as the two Goguryeo generals tried to rally their men to fight on, but the one-sided mass slaughter continued. Seeing that they could not salvage the situation, the two Goguryeo generals tried as best as they could to get what was left of their force out of the encirclement to rejoin the main body of their army across the river to the south, but 30,000 of their men were killed trying to do so. Worse came when they found out that the bridges in the river that leads them back to the main body of their army were already torn down by the Tang commander Zhangsun Wuji under orders from Emperor Taizong who already foresaw the event. Finding no other way to rejoin the main body of their army, the two generals rallied whatever remained of their force northwards to the peak of Mount Jupil with the Tang army in hot pursuit. The Tang army then caught up and encircled the remaining Goguryeo force atop Mount Jupil once again. In an attempt to save their beleaguered comrades atop Mount Jupil, the main body of the Goguryeo army finally joined the battle by fording the river and attacked the Tang army. However, they soon found themselves counterattacked on three sides by the Tang army, having failed to reach their comrades atop the mountain.

Seeing that all was lost, Ko Yŏnsu and Ko Hyejin surrendered what remained of their command that was stranded atop the mountain, now reduced to just 3,800 wounded and famished men. What remained of the Goguryeo army that had not yet surrendered, that is, the force that tried to save their comrades atop Mount Jupil but failed, is now also subjected by attacks of the Tang army on three sides, pummeling it into a pulp until they finally retreated and dispersed southwards, only to be chased down by the pursuing Tang army with most of them dead during the chase and captured 33,000 Goguryeo soldiers prisoner. Among these, the Tang forces sent 3,500 officers and chieftains back to China, executed 3,300 Mohe troops, and eventually released the rest of the ordinary Goguryeo soldiers. As part of the war spoils taken from the enemy, the Tang army captured from the vanquished Goguryeo army 50,000 horses, 50,000 cows, and 10,000 metal body armor.

== Aftermath ==
The destruction of the Goguryeo relief army at the hands of the Tang army isolated the city of Ansi from the rest of the Goguryeo kingdom. From then on, the garrison of the city would be left alone and at the mercy of the invading Tang army. The two Goguryeo generals, Ko Hyejin and Ko Yŏnsu, then defected to the Tang and were thus given imperial Chinese royal titles by Emperor Taizong, and they later on gave advice to the Emperor on his campaign to subjugate Goguryeo.

After the battle, the Emperor officially began the siege of the city that would go on for three months before being lifted due to the onset of bad weather and dwindling of supplies on part of the besiegers. Although the siege was abandoned and hence the city was saved, this disaster of a battle greatly consumed the already very limited manpower pool of Goguryeo so much that it would have a negative effects on its conduct of war for the rest of the conflict, which after years of battles and sieges would eventually result to the end of its existence and the conquest of most of its territory including its capital Pyongyang by the Tang with the rest going to another Korean kingdom, Silla, in 668 AD.

== Popular culture ==
The 2018 South Korean film The Great Battle featured this battle as its first scene.

== Bibliography ==
- Joe, Wanne J. (1972). Traditional Korea: A Cultural History. Seoul: Chung'ang University Press.
- Graff, David A. (2002). Medieval Chinese Warfare, 300-900. London: Routledge. ISBN 9780415239554.
- Wang, Zhenping (2013), Tang China in Multi-Polar Asia: A History of Diplomacy and War, University of Hawaii Press
