= Damu (name) =

Damu is a name.

== Given name ==
- Damu Cherry (1977-), American hurdler
- Damu Kenkre, Indian director
- Damu Smith (1951–2006), American peace activist

== Family name ==
- Irkab-Damu, King of Ebla
- Isar-Damu, King of Ebla
- Jimi Damu (1967–2018), Fijian rugby player
- Kun-Damu, King of Ebla
- Xiong Damu, Ming Dynasty novelist and historian

== Other ==
- Damu the Fudgemunk (1984-), American musician
- Suresh Damu Bhole, Indian politician
