= Korean wall =

Korean Wall may refer to:

- Cheolli Jangseong, the 11th century northern defense structure,
- Korean Wall, North Korean propaganda of a supposed concrete wall along the Korean Demilitarized Zone
