= Great Battle =

Great Battle may refer to:

- War of Wrath, or the Great Battle, the final war against Morgoth at the end of the First Age in J.R.R. Tolkien's legendarium
- The Great Battle (video game series), video games series in Compati Hero Series
- The Great Battle (film), 2018 South Korean film
- The Great Battle, an event in the Warriors series by Erin Hunter where all four clans, plus StarClan, fight against the Dark Forest.
