= 573 (disambiguation) =

573 may refer to:

- 573 (number), a number
- 573, the year 573 AD
- Area code 573, an area code in Missouri, U.S.

== Other uses ==
- The video game company Konami is represented by the number 573.
