= 575 =

Calendar year

575 in various calendars
- Gregorian calendar: 575; DLXXV
- Ab urbe condita: 1328
- Armenian calendar: 24; ԹՎ ԻԴ
- Assyrian calendar: 5325
- Balinese saka calendar: 496–497
- Bengali calendar: −19 – −18
- Berber calendar: 1525
- Buddhist calendar: 1119
- Burmese calendar: −63
- Byzantine calendar: 6083–6084
- Chinese calendar: 甲午年 (Wood Horse); 3272 or 3065 — to — 乙未年 (Wood Goat); 3273 or 3066
- Coptic calendar: 291–292
- Discordian calendar: 1741
- Ethiopian calendar: 567–568
- Hebrew calendar: 4335–4336
- Hindu calendars
- Vikram Samvat: 631–632
- Shaka Samvat: 496–497
- Kali Yuga: 3675–3676
- Holocene calendar: 10575
- Iranian calendar: 47 BP – 46 BP
- Islamic calendar: 48 BH – 47 BH
- Javanese calendar: 463–464
- Julian calendar: 575; DLXXV
- Korean calendar: 2908
- Minguo calendar: 1337 before ROC 民前1337年
- Nanakshahi calendar: −893
- Seleucid era: 886/887 AG
- Thai solar calendar: 1117–1118
- Tibetan calendar: ཤིང་ཕོ་རྟ་ལོ་ (male Wood-Horse); 701 or 320 or −452 — to — ཤིང་མོ་ལུག་ལོ་ (female Wood-Sheep); 702 or 321 or −451

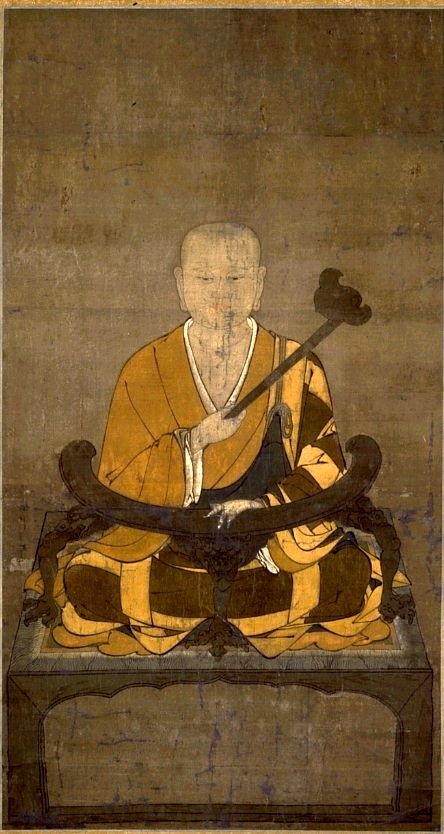
Śramana Zhiyi (538–597)

Year 575 (DLXXV) was a common year starting on Tuesday of the Julian calendar. The denomination 575 for this year has been used since the early medieval period, when the Anno Domini calendar era became the prevalent method in Europe for naming years.

== Events ==
=== By place ===
==== Europe ====
- The Franks under Sigibert I pursue his half brother Chilperic I, and conquer the cities Poitiers and Tournai. While he is proclaimed new king of Neustria by the nobles, Sigibert is assassinated at Vitry-en-Artois (Northern Gaul) by hirelings of Fredegund.
- Childebert II succeeds his father Sigibert I as king of Austrasia. His mother Brunhilda becomes regent and seeks protection from Guntram, king of Burgundy. He adopts Childebert as his own son and heir. A group of Frankish aristocrats rule Austrasia.
- The Visigoths under King Liuvigild invade the Suebian Kingdom (Northern Spain). Intermarriage between Goths and non-Goths is allowed in the Visigothic Kingdom (approximate date).

==== Britain ====
- The Convention of Druim Cett: Irish kings discuss the relationship between them and King Áedán mac Gabráin of Dál Riata. The Irish colony (now western Scotland) is confirmed, and rights to tax and levy are agreed to between the rulers.
- The Anglo-Saxon kingdom of East Anglia is divided into the English counties of Norfolk and Suffolk, and perhaps the eastern part of the Cambridgeshire Fens (approximate date).

==== Asia Minor ====
- Byzantine–Sassanid War: A Byzantine army under command of Maurice drives the Persians from Cappodocia (modern Turkey), and strengthens the Byzantine position in Caucasian Albania.
- Alexander of Tralles, Greek physician, writes "Libri duodecim de re Medica" (approximate date).

==== Asia ====
- Tardu succeeds his father Istämi, as governor (yabgu) of the Western Turkic Khaganate (Central Asia).

=== By topic ===
==== Religion ====
- Zhiyi, Chinese monk, travels to Mount Tiantai for intensive study and practice. He works with a group of disciples on the Indian meditation of śamatha and vipaśyanā.
- June 2 – Pope Benedict I succeeds Pope John III as the 62nd pope.

== Births ==
- Al-Khansa, Arabic poet (d. 645)
- Heraclius, emperor of the Byzantine Empire (approximate date)
- Wen Yanbo, chancellor of the Tang dynasty (d. 637)

== Deaths ==
- August 2 – Ahudemmeh, Syriac Orthodox Grand Metropolitan of the East.
- Áed mac Echach, king of Connacht (Ireland)
- Cerbonius, bishop of Populonia (Central Italy)
- Istämi, ruler (yabgu) of the Western Turkic Khaganate
- Sigebert I, king of Austrasia (approximate date)
