= 581 =

Calendar year

581 in various calendars
- Gregorian calendar: 581; DLXXXI
- Ab urbe condita: 1334
- Armenian calendar: 30; ԹՎ Լ
- Assyrian calendar: 5331
- Balinese saka calendar: 502–503
- Bengali calendar: −13 – −12
- Berber calendar: 1531
- Buddhist calendar: 1125
- Burmese calendar: −57
- Byzantine calendar: 6089–6090
- Chinese calendar: 庚子年 (Metal Rat); 3278 or 3071 — to — 辛丑年 (Metal Ox); 3279 or 3072
- Coptic calendar: 297–298
- Discordian calendar: 1747
- Ethiopian calendar: 573–574
- Hebrew calendar: 4341–4342
- Hindu calendars
- Vikram Samvat: 637–638
- Shaka Samvat: 502–503
- Kali Yuga: 3681–3682
- Holocene calendar: 10581
- Iranian calendar: 41 BP – 40 BP
- Islamic calendar: 42 BH – 41 BH
- Javanese calendar: 470–471
- Julian calendar: 581; DLXXXI
- Korean calendar: 2914
- Minguo calendar: 1331 before ROC 民前1331年
- Nanakshahi calendar: −887
- Seleucid era: 892/893 AG
- Thai solar calendar: 1123–1124
- Tibetan calendar: ལྕགས་ཕོ་བྱི་བ་ལོ་ (male Iron-Rat); 707 or 326 or −446 — to — ལྕགས་མོ་གླང་ལོ་ (female Iron-Ox); 708 or 327 or −445

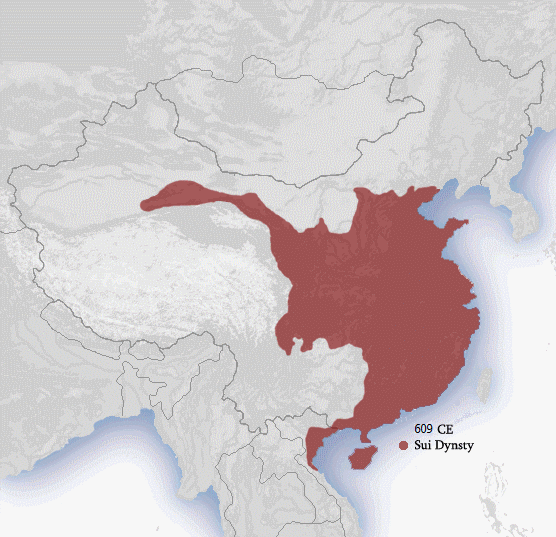
The Sui dynasty (581–618)

Year 581 (DLXXXI) was a common year starting on Wednesday of the Julian calendar. The denomination 581 for this year has been used since the early medieval period, when the Anno Domini calendar era became the prevalent method in Europe for naming years.

== Events ==
=== By place ===
==== Byzantine Empire ====
- Byzantine–Sasanian War: A Byzantine army commanded by Maurice, and supported by Ghassanid forces under King Al-Mundhir III, fails to capture the Persian capital, Ctesiphon, along the Euphrates.
- Maurice accuses Mundhir III of treason, and brings him to Constantinople to face trial. Emperor Tiberius II Constantine treats him well, and allows Mundhir with his family a comfortable residence.
- Al-Nu'man VI, son (de facto) of Mundhir III, revolts with the Ghassanids against the Byzantine Empire, after his father is treacherously arrested.

==== Europe ====
- Palace coup in Austrasia: New advisors break the peace treaty with King Guntram, and make a new alliance with his half brother Chilperic I, in which Childebert II, age 11, is recognized as Chilperic's heir.
- The Lombards under Zotto, Duke of Benevento, sack the abbey of Monte Cassino near Naples. The Benedictine monks who survive flee to Rome, but they return to the site, and rebuild the monastery.
- The Göktürks under Taspar Qaghan besiege the city of Chersonesos Taurica (modern Ukraine), located at the Black Sea; their cavalry keep plundering the steppes of the Crimean Peninsula until 590.

==== Britain ====
- The Anglo-Saxons under Ælla conquer Deira (Northern England) from the Britons. He becomes the first king of Deira (according to the Anglo-Saxon Chronicle).

==== Asia ====
- The Northern Zhou dynasty ends: Yáng Jiān executes the last ruler, 8-year-old Jing Di, along with 58 royal relatives at Chang'an. He proclaims himself emperor, and establishes the Sui dynasty in China.
- The "Great City of Helu", situated on the shores of Taihu Lake, is renamed Suzhou during the Sui dynasty (approximate date).
- In the Turkic Empire an interregnum begins, since there are several candidates to the throne: Talopien (late khagan's candidate), Ishbara (Kurultai's choice) and Tardu (western yabghu).
- Ishbara Qaghan, grandson of Bumin Qaghan, becomes the new ruler (khagan) of the Turkic Khaganate (Central Asia).
- The Sui dynasty begins.

=== By topic ===
==== Literature ====
- Maurice writes an encyclopedic work on the science of war (the Strategikon), which exercises a major influence on the military system.

==== Religion ====
- Second Council of Mâcon: In a council of Christian bishops in Mâcon (Burgundy), Jews are prohibited from serving as judges or customs officers.

== Births ==
- Sun Simiao, Chinese medicine doctor (approximate date)
- Yan Shigu, Chinese author of the Tang dynasty (d. 645)

== Deaths ==
- Feng Xiaolian, concubine of Gao Wei (approximate date)
- Jing Di, Chinese emperor of Northern Zhou (b. 573)
- Taspar Qaghan, ruler (khagan) of the Göktürks
