= Yanzhou Village =

Settlement in Dengta, Liaoning, China

Coordinates: 41°17′57.48″N 123°29′24″E

Yanzhou Village (Chinese: 燕州城; pinyin: Yānzhōuchéng) is a small settlement in Dengta Prefecture of Liaoyang Prefecture in Liaoning Province in China. The village is the site of the ancient Goguryeo city of Baegam (Hangul :백암성, Hanja :白巖城) in Korea or Baiyan City (Chinese: 白岩城) in Chinese. The ancient city was the scene a major battle between the Tang dynasty Chinese emperor Taizong and the Goguryeo in 645 AD.

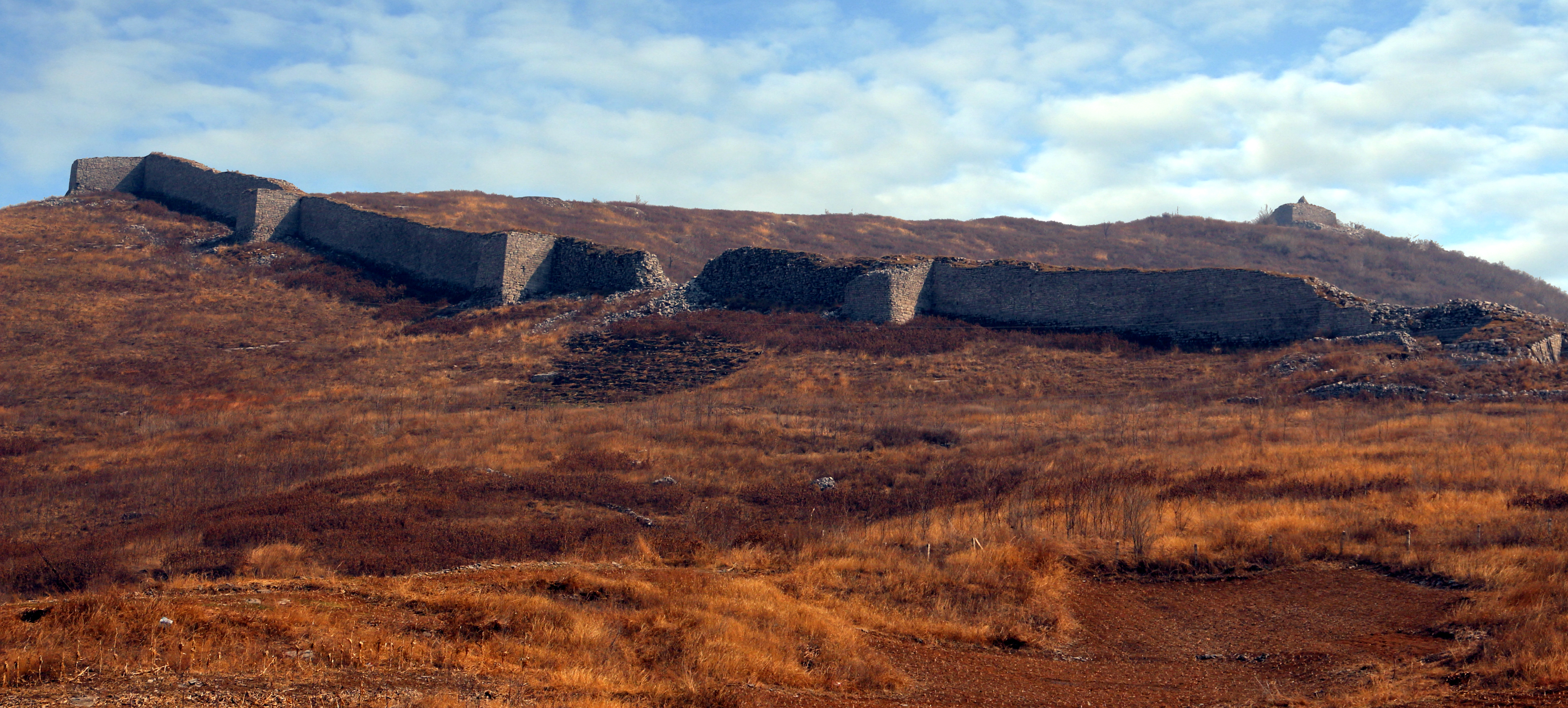
Yanzhou Village (Yanzhoucheng). North walls are visible in the foreground.

== History ==
The city dates to 403 AD and was built by the Goguryeo people who occupied much of the Liaodong Peninsula, modern Jilin province, Northern Korean Peninsula and part of the Primorsky Krai in modern Russia. Yanzhou was a major city at the frontier between the Goguryeo and Tang dynasty China.

In 642 AD, the Goguryeo had a war with the neighbouring land of Silla on the Korean Peninsula. The Silla appealed to the Tang Emperor for assistance and in 645, the Emperor Taizong attacked the Goguryeo. The Tang first captured nearby Liaodong City. Then in June, they attacked at Yanzhou led by Tang Jun and after fierce fighting and some notable heroics by the Emperor and his generals, won.

== Location ==
The city was built on a ridge on the northern side of the Taizi River. (Chinese: 太子河; pinyin: Tàizǐhé), approximately 20 km east of Liaoyang and 50 km south of Shenyang (Chinese: 沈阳; pinyin: Shěnyáng).

== Construction ==
As with other Goguryeo forts, Yanzhou village was built on a hill adjacent to a river, with the river forming a natural barrier. Cliffs form the southern side of the city and a high defensive wall formed an arch around the west, north and east sides. The land slopes such that the eastern side of the city is significantly higher than the west. The site is about 480 metres long and 440 metres wide. The city walls, which are still visible today, cover some 1840 metres in length. The walls were 2 to 3 metres thick and between 5 and 8 metres high with towers at regular intervals along its length, and is comparable to the Great Wall of China in its dimensions. At the top of the ridge are the remains of a square tower with a wall enclosed area to its east. The gate to the city was to the west, near the Taizi River. The construction is of rough-cut stone built dry without mortar.

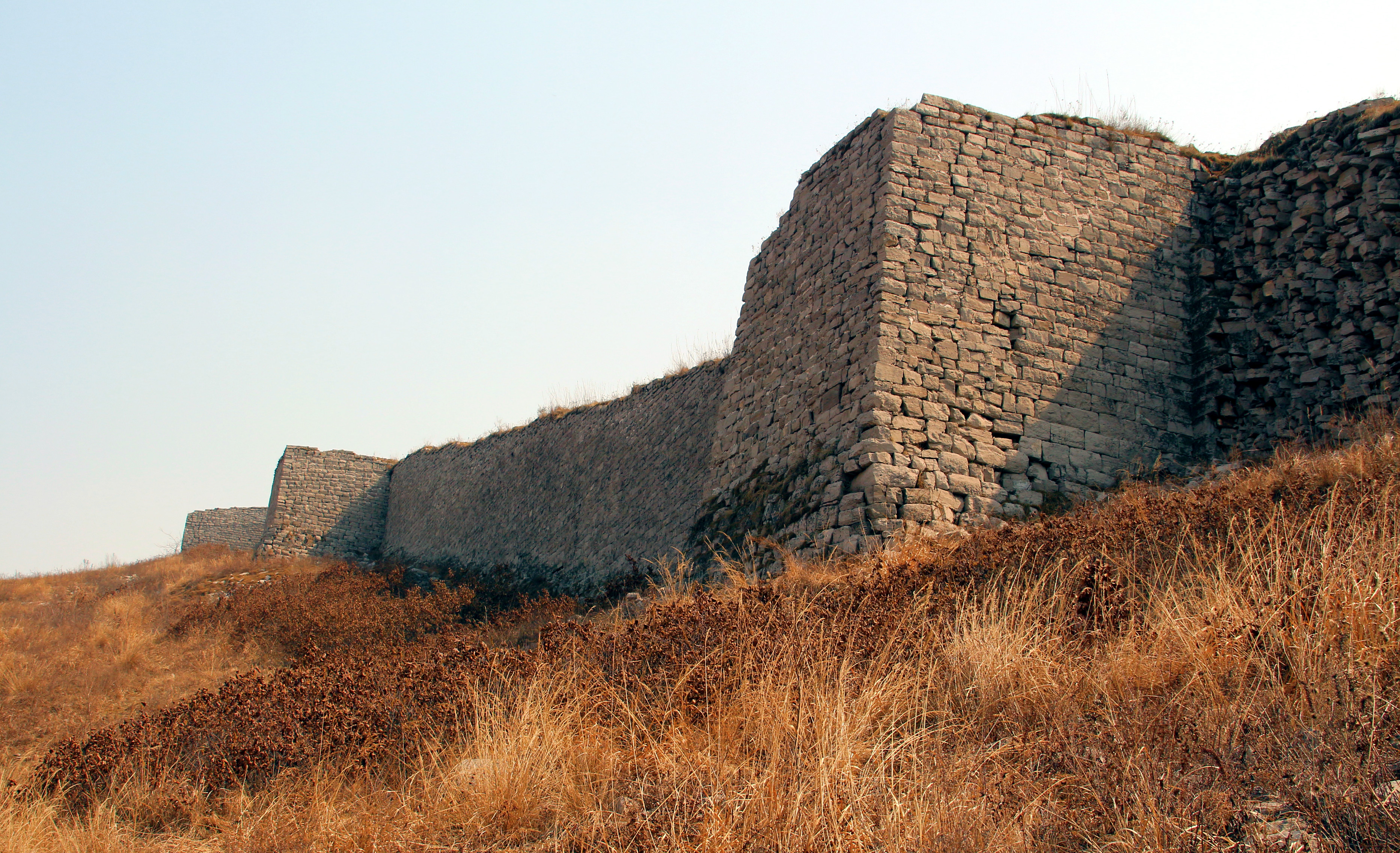
Yanzhou Village (Yanzhoucheng) - North Walls

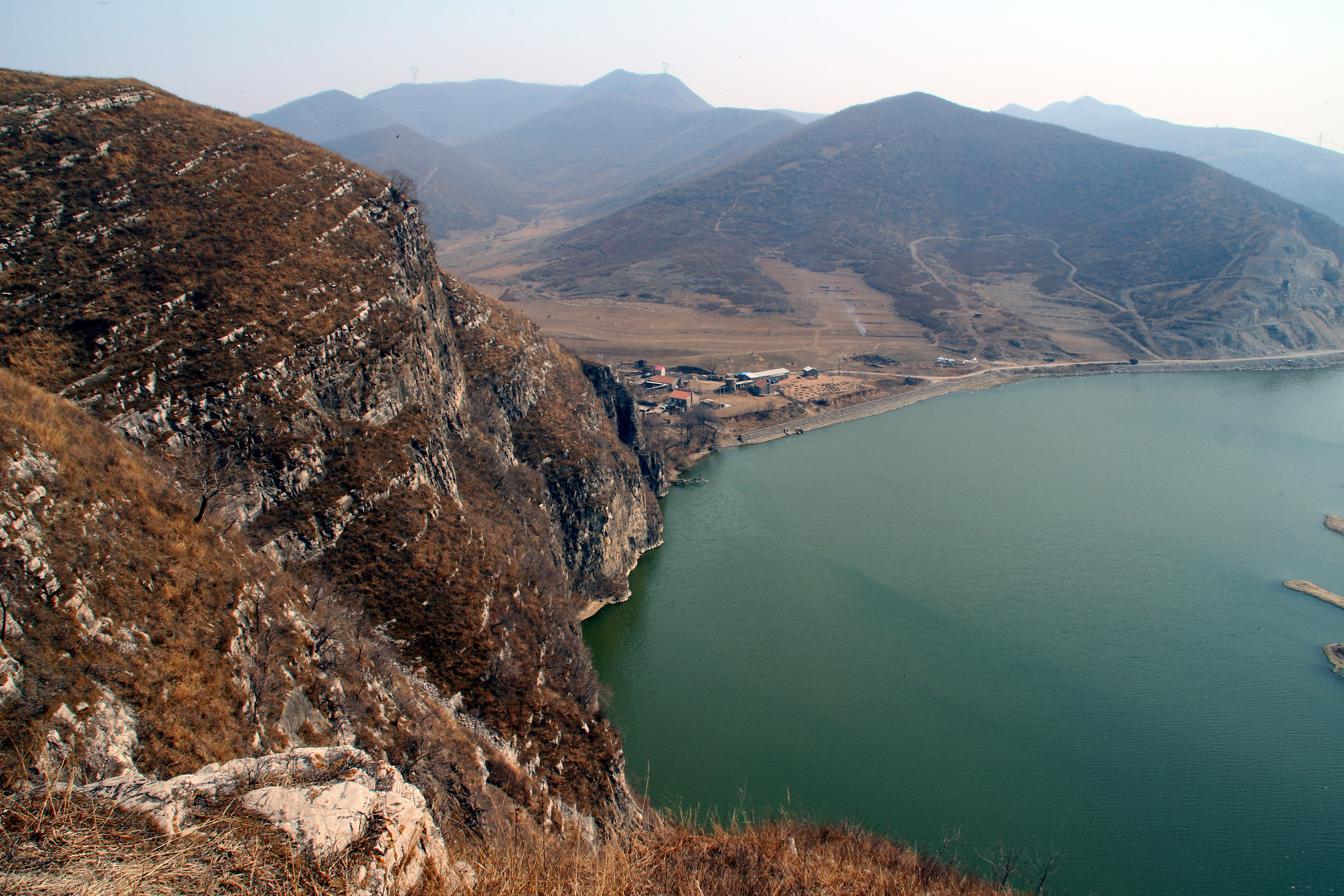
Taizi River as seen from Yanzhou Village (Yanzhoucheng) (looking South East)

== Status ==
The city walls in Yanzhou are a protected site of Liaoning province. Despite its protected status, some of the western sections of the city walls have been dismantled by the adjacent villagers and stones taken from the wall can be seen in various homes and fences throughout the village. By comparison, the city walls on the northern and eastern sections appear to be in good condition.

== Accessibility ==
As of 2014 the site was not developed to encourage tourism and there was no tourist infrastructure present to facilitate tourism related activities within the city walls. Access to the site was neither monitored nor actively controlled.

The city can be easily reached by automobile, as paved roads connect it to both Liaoyang and Shenyang.
