= 573 =

Calendar year

573 in various calendars
Gregorian calendar	573; DLXXIII
Ab urbe condita	1326
Armenian calendar	22; ԹՎ ԻԲ
Assyrian calendar	5323
Balinese saka calendar	494–495
Bengali calendar	−21 – −20
Berber calendar	1523
Buddhist calendar	1117
Burmese calendar	−65
Byzantine calendar	6081–6082
Chinese calendar	壬辰年 (Water Dragon); 3270 or 3063 — to — 癸巳年 (Water Snake); 3271 or 3064
Coptic calendar	289–290
Discordian calendar	1739
Ethiopian calendar	565–566
Hebrew calendar	4333–4334
- Hindu calendars
Vikram Samvat	629–630
Shaka Samvat	494–495
Kali Yuga	3673–3674
Holocene calendar	10573
Iranian calendar	49 BP – 48 BP
Islamic calendar	51 BH – 50 BH
Javanese calendar	461–462
Julian calendar	573; DLXXIII
Korean calendar	2906
Minguo calendar	1339 before ROC 民前1339年
Nanakshahi calendar	−895
Seleucid era	884/885 AG
Thai solar calendar	1115–1116
Tibetan calendar	ཆུ་ཕོ་འབྲུག་ལོ་ (male Water-Dragon); 699 or 318 or −454 — to — ཆུ་མོ་སྦྲུལ་ལོ་ (female Water-Snake); 700 or 319 or −453

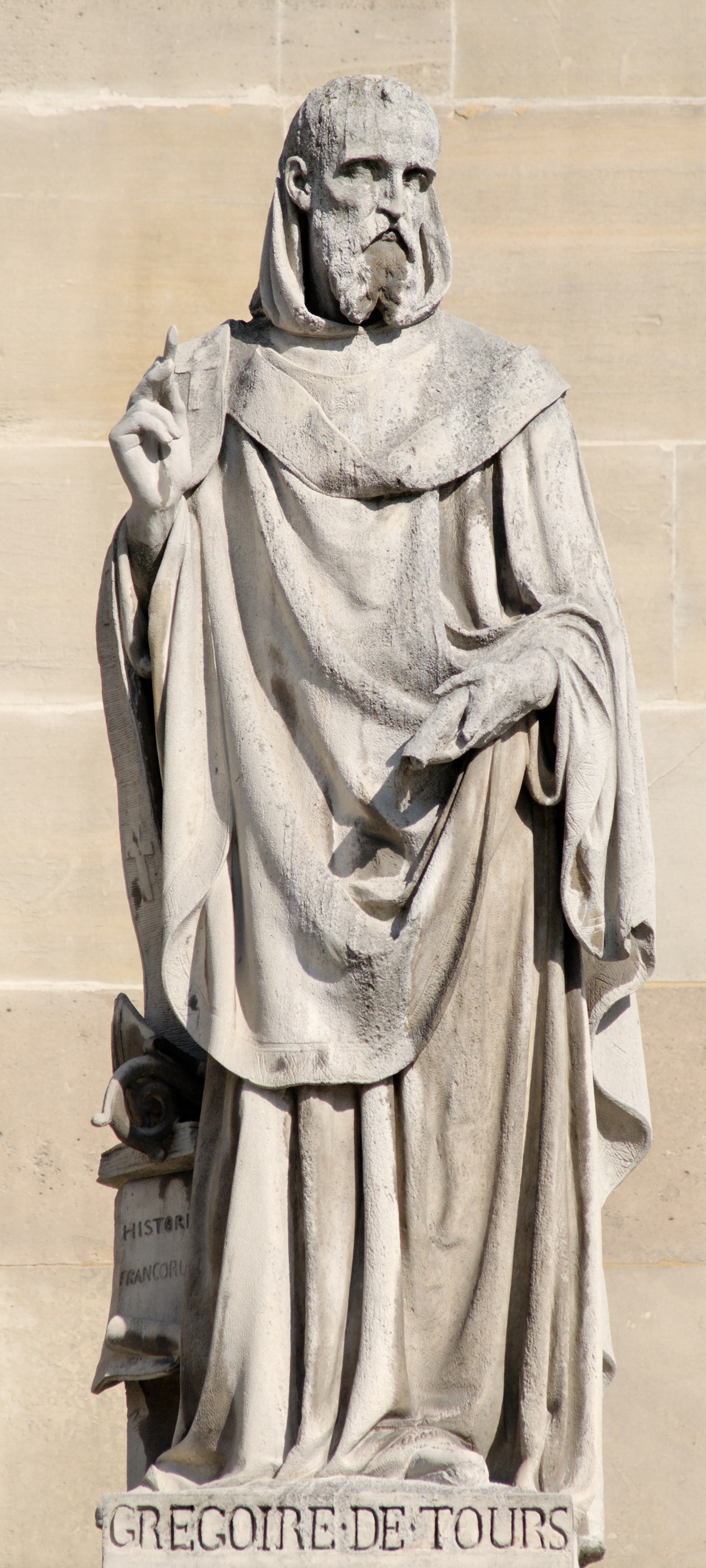
Gregory of Tours (c. 538–594)

Year 573 (DLXXIII) was a common year starting on Sunday of the Julian calendar. The denomination 573 for this year has been used since the early medieval period, when the Anno Domini calendar era became the prevalent method in Europe for naming years.

== Events ==
=== By place ===
==== Byzantine Empire ====
- Byzantine–Sassanid War: Persian forces under the command of King Khosrau I capture the Byzantine stronghold of Dara, after a six-month siege. Meanwhile, a smaller Persian army under Adarmahan advances from Babylon through the desert, crosses the Euphrates River and ravages Syria. The cities of Apamea and Antiochia are plundered.

==== Europe ====
- King Sigibert I goes to war against his half brother Chilperic I of Neustria at the urging of his wife, Brunhilda. He appeals to the Germans on the right bank of the Rhine for help, and they obligingly attack the environs of Paris and Chartres.
- The Lombards again raid Southern Gaul, but are defeated by the Franks under Mummolus, patricius and son of the Gallo-Roman count of Auxerre, and are driven out.
- King Cleph completes the Lombard conquest of Tuscany (Central Italy) and extends his dominion to the gates of Ravenna.
- Sigibert I appoints Gregory to succeed his mother's cousin, Eufronius, as bishop of Tours (approximate date).

==== Britain ====
- Battle of Arfderydd: Leading his warband, Gwenddoleu ap Ceidio is slain by the sons of Eliffer, Gwrgi and Peredur. Myrddin Wyllt goes mad watching this defeat (according to the Annales Cambriae).

=== By topic ===
==== Religion ====
- Pope John III is forced by the Lombards to retire from Rome, and takes up residence at the Catacombs along the Via Appia (approximate date).

== Births ==
- Abu Bakr, Muslim Caliph (approximate date)
- Chen Yin, crown prince of the Chen dynasty
- Dou Jiande, general of the Sui dynasty (d. 621)
- Jing Di, emperor of Northern Zhou (d. 581)
- Lupus of Sens, French bishop (approximate date)

== Deaths ==
- June 11 – Emilian of Cogolla, Iberic saint (b. 472)
- Brendan of Birr, Irish abbot (approximate date)
- Gwenddoleu ap Ceidio, Brythonic king
- Narses, Byzantine general (b. 478)
- Wang Lin, Chinese general (b. 526)
