= Yang Manch'un =

Goguryeo commander

- Hangul: 양만춘
- Hanja: 楊萬春
- RR: Yang Manchun
- MR: Yang Manch'un

Portrait depicting the Goguryeo general Yang Manchun

Yang Manch'un is the name given to the Goguryeo commander of Ansi Fortress in the 640s. Ansi Fortress was located on the Goguryeo–Tang border, probably present-day Haicheng. Yang is sometimes credited with saving the kingdom by his successful defense against Tang Taizong.

== Name ==
The real name of the defender of Ansi Fortress is unclear. Kim Pusik, in his Samguk Sagi (Chronicles of the Three Kingdoms), lamented that the name of the steadfast commander of Ansi Fortress was unknown:

Emperor Taizong of Tang was a prominent and intelligent ruler not commonly seen. He ended disturbances like Tang of Shang and King Wu of Zhou, and he governed with reason like King Cheng of Zhou and King Kang of Zhou. When he commanded armies, he had infinite strategies and had no rival. But when he attacked east, he was defeated at Ansi. Therefore, the defender of Ansi must have been a hero and also an unusually brilliant man. However, his name was lost to history. This is like how the Yangzi stated, "The name of that great official from the Qi-Lu region [(i.e., modern Shandong)] is lost to history." This is lamentable.

However, an author by the name of Xiong Damu from the Ming dynasty used the name Liang Wanchun (梁萬春) to refer to the defender in his Historical Fiction novel Tangshu Zhizhuan Tongsu Yanyi. During the Japanese invasions of Korea, the Ming generals Wu Zongdao and Li Shifa said to Yun Kŭnsu that the defender's name is Liang Wanchun. In 1669, Hyeonjong of Joseon asked Song Chun-gil for his name and he gave his name as Yang Manch'un, the Korean way of pronouncing the Hanja "梁萬春". In Song Chun-gil's The Separate Collected Works of Master Tongch'undang (동춘당선생별집; 同春堂先生別集; Tongch'undang sŏnsaeng pyŏljip), first compiled in 1768, includes the passage: "Someone asked, 'What was the name of the commander of Ansi fortress?' Song Chun-gil replied, 'It was Yang Manch'un. He skillfully checked the army of Taizong and so might we very well call him "sŏnsu sŏngja" (선수성자, 善守城者, "capable defender of fortresses").'" As the hanja characters 梁 and 楊 were both pronounced as Yang in some dialects, the surname slowly began to be mistakenly interpreted as the character 楊. In The Jehol Diary written by Pak Chiwŏn in the 18th century includes the following: "When Yang Manch'un, the master of Ansi-sŏng Fortress, shot an arrow and put out the eye of the Emperor Taizong of the Tang dynasty, the emperor assembled his army under the wall. This was not the signal for an immediate attack, but to demonstrate the Emperor's generosity in granting Yang Manch'un one hundred p'il roll of silk, praising him for defending the Fortress successfully for his own Korean king." In time Yang Manch'un came into general use as the name of the defender of Ansi Fortress.

== Involvement in the Goguryeo–Tang War ==
In 642, Yŏn Kaesomun killed King Yeongnyu and seized military control over the country. However, although Yŏn had quickly gained control over the rest of the country, Yang Manch'un refused to surrender Ansi fortress. After a lengthy siege and repeated unsuccessful attempts to storm the fortress, Yŏn was forced to withdraw and allow Yang to keep his position as fortress commander. This proved to be to his advantage.

In 645, Taizong led a campaign against Goguryeo. Some Goguryeo border fortresses fell early, but Tang was unable to reduce Ansi fortress. Goguryeo sent a force reported at 150,000 to raise the siege of Ansi fortress, but the force was unable to reach it. Despite its siege of Ansi, the Tang army was unable to force its capitulation. Taizong eventually ordered the construction of a large earthen siege ramp, which Yang instead captured and used as part of his defense. When winter approached, Tang forces were forced to withdraw.

The siege of Ansi fortress is related in detail (but without the commander's name) in the Samguk Sagi, Goguryeo vol. 9. (vol. 21 overall).

== In popular culture ==
- Portrayed by Im Dong-jin in the 2006–2007 KBS TV series Dae Jo-yeong.
- Portrayed by Shin Dong-hoon in 2006–2007 SBS TV series Yeon Gaesomun.
- Portrayed by Joo Jin-mo in the KBS2 TV series The Blade and Petal.
- Portrayed by Jo In-sung in 2018 film The Great Battle

== See also ==
- History of Korea
- Military history of Goguryeo
