= Fayuan Temple =

Buddhist temple in Beijing, China

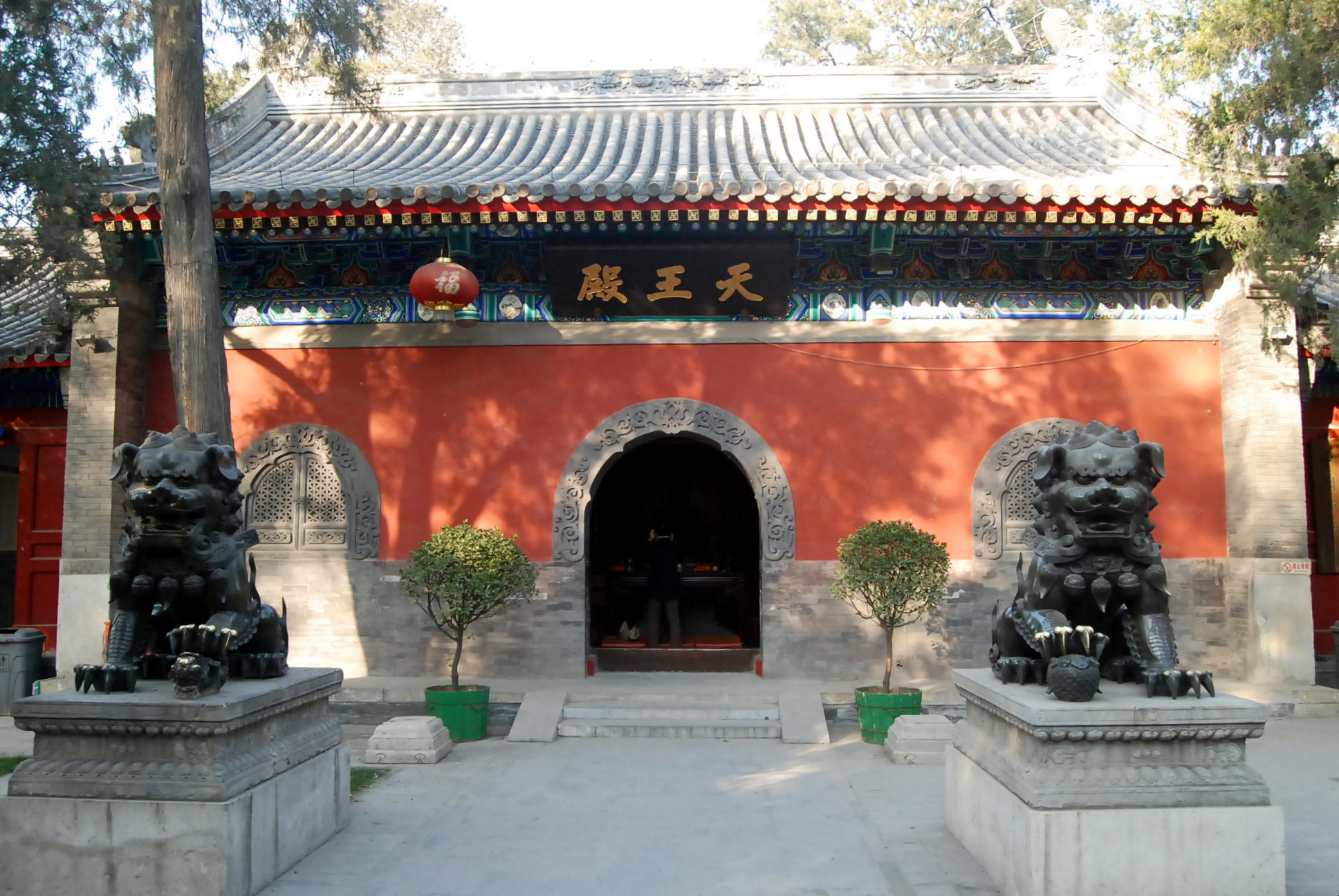
- The Fayuan Temple

- Location in Beijing

Religion
- Affiliation: Buddhism

Location
- Location: Beijing
- Country: China
- Interactive map of Fayuan Temple
- Coordinates: 39°53′02″N 116°21′49″E

Architecture
- Style: Chinese architecture
- Established: 645
- Completed: 1437 (reconstruction)

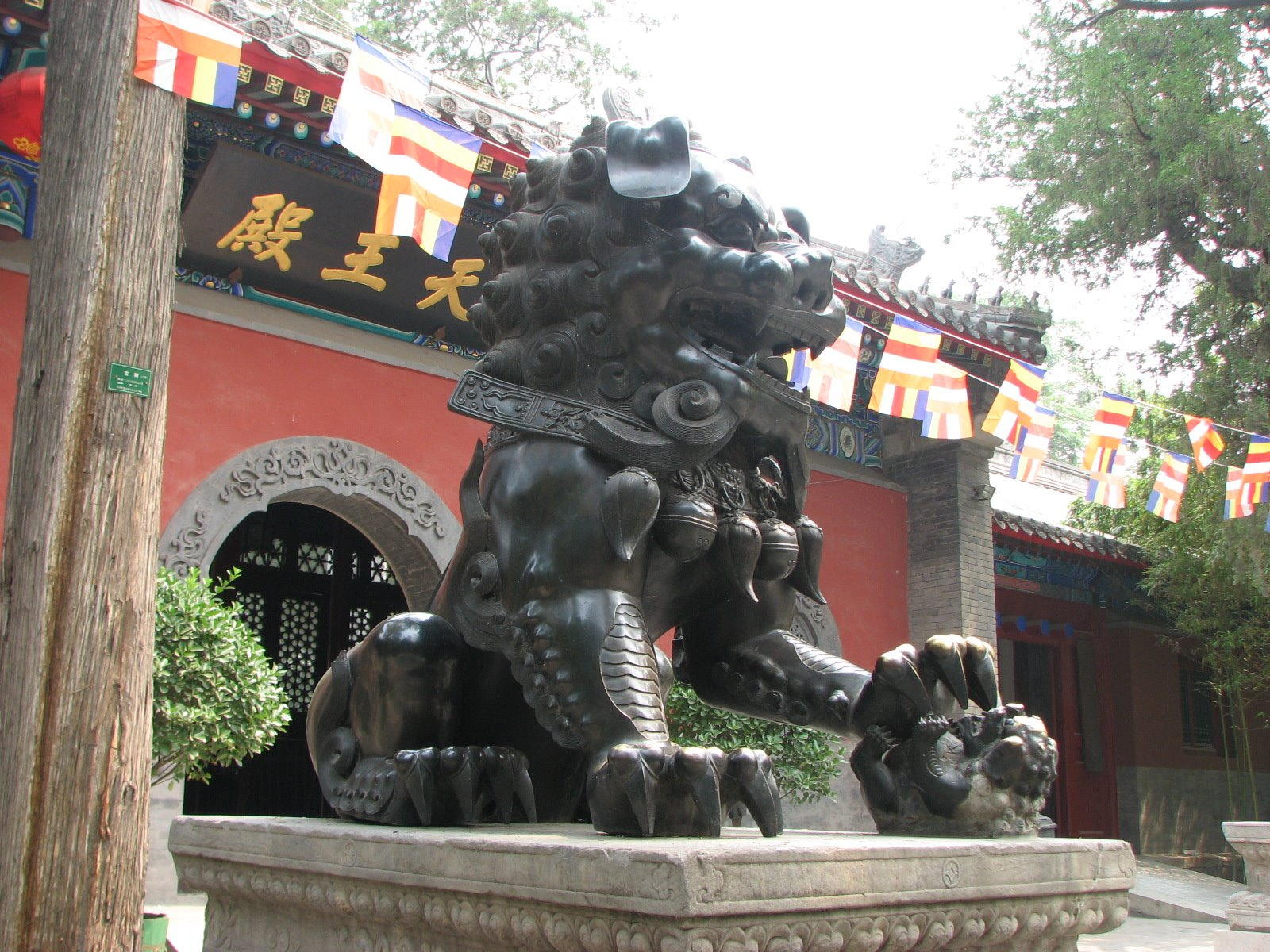
Bronze sculptures at one of its entrances

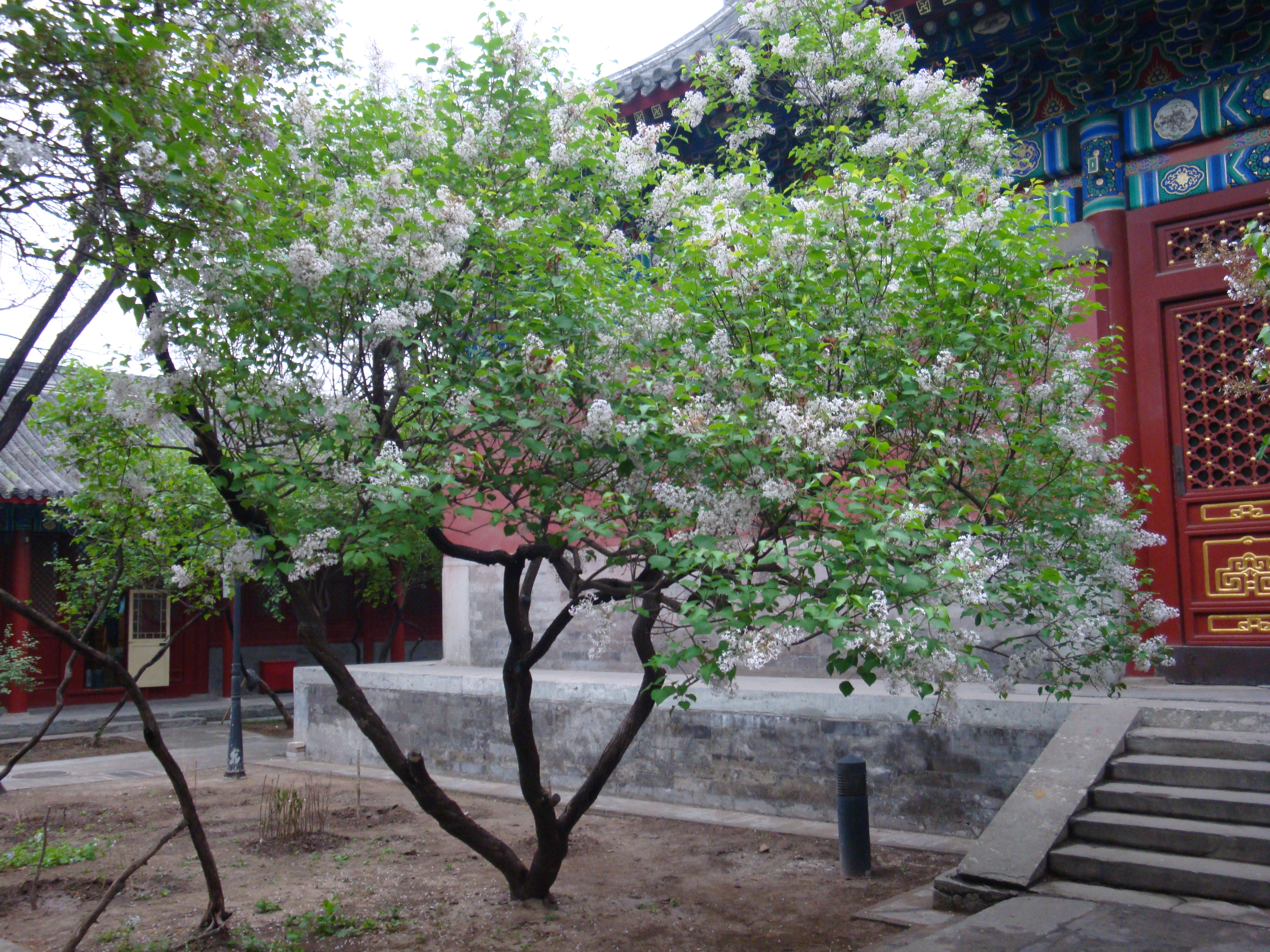

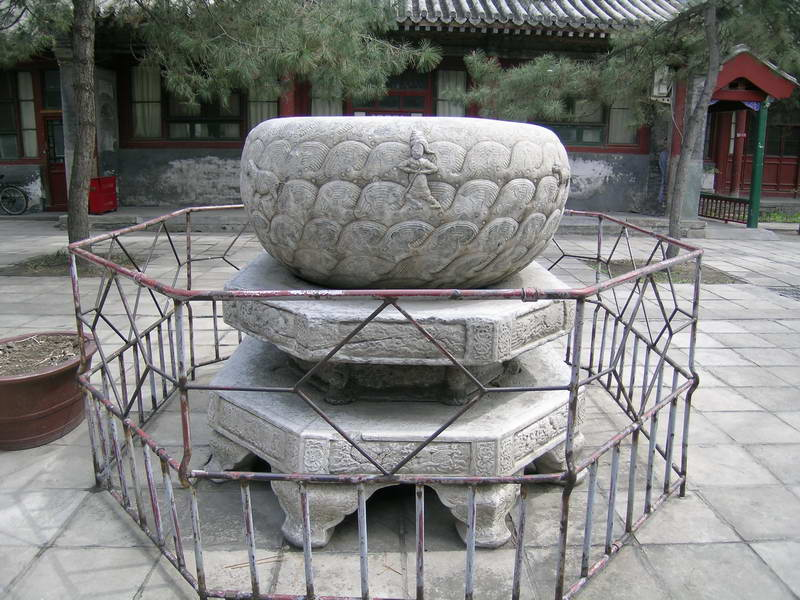

The Fayuan Temple (Chinese: 法源寺; pinyin: Fǎyuán Sì), situated in the southwest quarter of central Beijing, is one of the city's oldest and most renowned Buddhist temples.

== History ==
The Fayuan Temple, originally named the Minzhong Temple, was first built in 645 during the Tang dynasty by Li Shimin (Emperor Taizong), and later rebuilt in the Zhengtong era (1436–1449) of the Ming dynasty. Emperor Taizong founded the temple to commemorate his soldiers who died in his campaign against Goguryeo. The temple occupies an area of 6,700 square meters. The temple also contains a large number of cultural relics, including sculptures of ancient bronzes, stone lions, as well as gilded figures of the three Buddhas. The temple also features large number of Buddhist texts from the Ming and Qing dynasties.

== Structure ==
It has a compact overall arrangement and buildings are arranged along the medial axis symmetrically. Main buildings there include the Gate of Temple, Heavenly King Hall, Main Hall, Hall of Great Compassion, Sutra Hall, and Bell and Drum Towers.

On both sides of the Gate of Temple stand the Bell Tower and the Drum Tower respectively. The Main Hall, which is magnificent and sacred, houses Statues of Flower Adornment School's three saints: Vairocana, Manjusri, and Samantabhadra. The Hall of Great Compassion houses statues, carved stones, and artistic masterpieces. Among these statues there stand some of the most valuable statues in ancient China - Pottery Statue of Sitting Buddha of the Eastern Han dynasty (25-220), Pottery-bottle Statue of Buddha of the Eastern Wu dynasty (229–280), Stone Statue of Buddha of the Tang dynasty (618–907), and Steel-cast Statue of Guanyin.

Taiwanese writer Li Ao, who published a novel Martyrs' Shrine: The Story of the Reform Movement of 1898 in China (another name is called "Fayuan Temple"), is about the beginning and the failure of the Hundred Days' Reform in the late Qing dynasty. He was nominated for the Nobel Prize in Literature.
