= The Great Battle (film) =

- Theatrical release poster
- Directed by: Kim Kwang-sik
- Written by: Kim Kwang-sik
- Produced by: Kim Woo-taek; Jang Kyung-ik; Park Jae-soo; Mo Chong-jin
- Starring: Zo In-sung; Nam Joo-hyuk; Park Sung-woong; Bae Seong-woo; Uhm Tae-goo; Kim Seol-hyun; Park Byung-eun; Oh Dae-hwan; Sung Dong-il; Jung Eun-chae; Yu Oh-seong
- Cinematography: Nam Dong-geun
- Edited by: Kim Chang-ju
- Music by: Yoon Il-sang
- Production companies: Soojak Film; Studio&NEW
- Distributed by: Next Entertainment World
- Release date: September 19, 2018
- Running time: 136 minutes
- Country: South Korea
- Languages: Korean; Mandarin
- Budget: ₩21.5 billion (c. US$19.2 million)
- Box office: US$41.5 million

The Great Battle (Korean: 안시성; Hanja: 安市城; RR: Ansi-seong; lit. 'Ansi Fortress') is a 2018 South Korean epic historical action film written and directed by Kim Kwang-sik. It is about the siege of Ansi Fortress in 645 CE and the epic eighty-eight day battle that Yang Manchun and his Goguryeo troops fought against invading Tang forces. It stars Zo In-sung, Nam Joo-hyuk, and Park Sung-woong.

The Great Battle received polarized reactions from the audience, with some praising it and others criticizing its lack of historical accuracy. Nevertheless, the film was a commercial success and grossed over US$41.5 million.

== Premise ==
The Great Battle is a historical film about the siege of Ansi Fortress in 645 CE and the epic eighty-eight day battle that Yang Manchun and his Goguryeo troops fought against 20,000 invading Tang forces to defend it. The movie opens with the Battle of Mount Jupil on June 23, 645 CE, followed by the Tang dynasty attack on Ansi Fortress to take over the land of Goguryeo for land expansion. While the Tang dynasty sought to make troops of Yang Manchun surrender by using artillery weapons, Ansi's defenders withstood and protected the Ansi Fortress from the attack despite having a numerically inferior number of soldiers. Ultimately, Goguryeo troops won against the Tang after Yang Manchun's arrow successfully inflicted fatal damage on the Tang Emperor Taizong, resulting in his troops retreat due to their emperor's wound and low supplies.

== Cast ==
- Zo In-sung as Yang Manchun
- Nam Joo-hyuk as Sa-mul
- Park Sung-woong as Li Shimin
- Bae Seong-woo as Choo Soo-ji
- Uhm Tae-goo as Pa-so
- Kim Seol-hyun as Baek-ha
- Park Byung-eun as Poong
- Oh Dae-hwan as Hwal-bo
- Sung Dong-il as Woo-dae
- Jung Eun-chae as Si-mi
- Yu Oh-seong as Yeon Gaesomun
- Jang Gwang as So Byeoldori
- Yeo Hoe-hyun as Ma-ro
- Stephanie Lee as Dal-rae

== Production ==
On 23 August 2017, filming began, finishing on 24 January 2018. Director Kim Kwang-sik researched to gain deeper insights into the historical Korean battle depicted in the film. Casting was focused on generally young actors given the numerous action scenes. Later, it was officially announced that the film will feature an ensemble cast led by Zo In-sung, Nam Joo-hyuk, and Park Sung-woong, with Bae Seong-woo, Uhm Tae-goo, Kim Seol-hyun, Park Byung-eun, Oh Dae-hwan, Sung Dong-il, Jung Eun-chae, and Yu Oh-seong in supporting roles.

The filming set featured a replica of the Ansi Fortress that was 11 metres (36 ft; 12 yd) high and 180 metres (590 ft; 200 yd) long. Given that the source of information about The Great Battle was very limited in Korea, Kim had to read at least 100 publications in Japan and China to learn more about the actual battle. He further expanded his research to find more information about Yang Manchun since it was also very limited. Due to a lack of sources, the director just referenced sources he had and filled the gaps with cinematic imagination. Although most Korean historical movies or dramas have cast old Korean actors as generals, Kim wanted to cast relatively young actors. Given that this movie contains a lot of fighting scenes, he thought it would be more realistic to use young actors who can fight in battle scenes. To handle action scenes, actors went through serious training with professionals. The director used special equipment such as a 4K camera, a Phantom camera, and a robotic arm to catch the fighting scenes in slow motion effectively.

== Release ==
The film premiered in South Korea on September 19, 2018, with age 12-rating. The film was released alongside Fengshui, The Negotiation, and The Nun, considered the most competitive week on the Korean Box Office this year.

The film was released in North America on September 21, 2018. As of September 21, the film had been sold to over 32 countries, with release dates in the United Kingdom, Vietnam, Australia, New Zealand, Taiwan, and Singapore set in October 2018.

It was released on V.O.D on October 24, 2018.

== Reception ==
=== Critical response ===
The film received positive reviews from critics. Praise was given to its cinematography, Kim's directing, the action sequences and acting performances. However, there were criticisms regarding the portrayal of Yang Man-chun and the historical accuracy of the film.

Yoon Min-sik from The Korea Herald wrote, "Director Kim did a clever job of masking his actors' weak points and making the most of their strengths in this action-packed flick. Jo's voice still seems out of place in a period piece, but his character refrains from making any more big speeches, taking action instead. It is very unlikely that Yang Man-chun was in his mid-30s, or that there was a squad of beautiful women shooting blowguns, or a group of borderline super-soldiers fighting without their helmets, but this movie throws historical accuracy out the window and the result is a lot of fun."

Shim Sun-ah from Yonhap News Agency wrote, "Visually striking, imaginative and compelling, The Great Battle easily claims its status as one of the most impressive war epics to have come out of Korean cinema in a long time. Since little is known about the battle and Yang Man-chun, making a tentpole based on long-forgotten ancient history with a relatively untested director was a massive gamble and could have gone wrong. However, he combined his energetic style with spectacular slow-motion sequences depicting every detail of the battle's ferocious brutality and the fear of the outnumbered Goguryo soldiers as they see the swarming Tang invaders."

Cary Darling from the Houston Chronicle wrote, "Director Kim Kwang-shik has a surprisingly keen eye for wide-screen, CGI-embellished action choreography that is often wildly impressive... The Great Battle rings with the echoes of such sweeping, cinematic blitzkriegs as the Battle of Helm's Deep in Peter Jackson's The Lord of the Rings: The Two Towers or any number of Game of Thrones assaults."

Richard Yu from Cinema Escapist wrote, "while The Great Battle excels at action-packed scenes and a fast-moving storyline, the screenwriting falls short. A mysterious oracle who happens to be Yang's former love interest makes an appearance, but adds little to the story before she is quickly killed off. And much to our dismay, Baek-ha never gets to fully develop her relationship with her dashing cavalry officer before he dies in combat. While this may be due to the limited running time of 136 minutes, director Kim Kwang-sik could have taken a page from John Woo's Red Cliff and split the film into two parts to give the ensemble cast ample time to develop their characters."

The film also received negative reviews from the audience. Don Anelli from Asian Movie Plus argued that irrelevant content stories such as an extended focus on "life or soldiers" and the details of a "psychic that's held hostage at the compound" made the movie about twenty minutes longer than it should be, making the movie tiring to watch.

Another criticism the movie received was whether "Jo In-Sung was the right choice for the Lord of Ansisung role." Although he is a good actor, the image and voice he emits in the movie, such as the high-pitched tone, don't match well with his character as a general.

The Assistant Professor of Korean History at Catholic University criticized the movie since the movie didn't accurately depict the actual battle based on historical facts. In the very last scene of the movie, the arrow shot by Yang Manchun, the general of Goguryeo, pierced through one of the eyes of the Tang dynasty emperors. This is an unverified anecdote and cannot be regarded as a fact.

=== Box office ===
The film grossed US$194,200 from previews and pre-sales.

On its opening day, the film finished in first place at the box office by attracting 122,699 moviegoers with US$870,571 in gross. After four days of strong performance, the film surpassed 1 million admissions on September 23. During its opening weekend, the film topped the box office with US$9.1 million gross from 1,128,374 attendees, leaving Fengshui and The Negotiation in second and third place respectively.

On September 24, 6 days after its release, the film surpassed 2 million admissions, sooner than 2012 Chuseok's hit Masquerade which surpassed the milestone in 8 days. The film surpassed 3 million admissions two days later. On September 29, the film surpassed 4 million admissions after topping the box office for 10 days. The film maintained its position at the top of the box office charts during its second weekend, though having a 29% drop in gross with US$6.5 million from 815,042 attendance.

The film surpassed 5 million admissions on October 6, 2018. During its third weekend, the film earned US$1.8 million gross from 234,886 attendees, 72% lower gross compared to its second weekend. The film finished third, trailing Venom and Dark Figure of Crime. The film finished in fifth place during its fourth weekend, having a 70% drop in gross compared to the previous weekend.

On October 22, the film surpassed its break-even point at 5.4 million admissions. The film attracted 5,441,020 moviegoers with a US$41.5 million gross.

== Awards and nominations ==
Awards	Category	Recipient	Result	Ref.
38th Korean Association of Film Critics Awards	Top 11 Films	The Great Battle	Won	
38th Korean Association of Film Critics Awards	Best New Actor	Nam Joo-hyuk	Won	
55th Baeksang Arts Awards	Best New Actor	Nam Joo-hyuk	Nominated	
2nd The Seoul Awards	Best New Actor	Nam Joo-hyuk	Won	
39th Blue Dragon Film Awards	Best New Actor	Nam Joo-hyuk	Won	
39th Blue Dragon Film Awards	Best Cinematography and Lightning	Nam Dong-geun & Jung Hae-ji	Nominated	
39th Blue Dragon Film Awards	Technical Award (Special Effects)	Yoon Dae-won	Nominated	
5th Korean Film Producers Association Awards	Best Supporting Actor	Bae Seong-woo	Won	
