= Qilibi Khan =

Qilibi Qaghan
- Qaghan of the Eastern Turkic Khaganate
- Reign: 639–647
- Coronation: 13 August 639
- Predecessor: Illig Qaghan
- Successor: Chebi Khan
- Born: Ashina Simo 阿史那思摩; 583
- Died: 16 May 647 (aged 63–64); Changan
- Burial: Zhaoling
Regnal name
- Yǐmíníshúqílìbiékěhàn 乙彌泥熟俟利苾可汗
- House: Ashina
- Father: Tughruq Shad

Yiminishuqilibi Qaghan (乙彌泥孰俟力苾可汗), personal name Ashina Simo (阿史那思摩), and commonly known as Qilibi Qaghan (Chinese: 俟力苾可汗, (Pinyin): qílìbì kěhàn, (Wade-Giles): ch'i-li-pi k'o-han, Middle Chinese: (Guangyun) [dʐʱi̯ə˥li̯əkbʱi̯et kʰɑ˥ɣɑn˩˥], died 647) was a member of the Eastern Turkic (Göktürk) royal house and the Khagan of Eastern Turks from 639 to 647. Simo served as a vassal of the Chinese Tang dynasty, as a vassal he was given the Tang noble title Prince of Huaihua (懷化王) as well as the surname Li (李思).

== Background ==
After Emperor Taizong of Tang conquered the Eastern Turkic Khaganate in 630, he briefly settled the Eastern Turks within Tang borders, but after a failed assassination attempt against him by Ashina Jiesheshuai, a member of the Eastern Turkic royal house, in 639, he changed his mind and decided to resettle the Eastern Turks between the Great Wall and the Gobi Desert, to serve as a buffer between the Tang and Xueyantuo. He made Ashina Simo (later Qilibi Khan) –also a member of Eastern Turkic royal house– Yiminishuqilibi Khan (Qilibi Khan), and Ashina Simo served as the khan of the recreated Eastern Turkic Khaganate for several years. However, in 644, faced with constant pressure from the Xueyantuo, Ashina Simo's people abandoned him and fled south back to Tang territory. Ashina Simo himself also returned to the Tang and served as a Tang general until his death, probably in 645.

== During the reigns of Ashina Duojishi, Ashina Silifu, and Ashina Duobi ==
Qilibi Khan was born in 583. He was in the same royal Ashina clan as the khans of Turks and was a grandson of Taspar Qaghan. His father Tugruq Shad (咄六設) was a son of Taspar, which would make him to senior to Shibi Qaghan, Chuluo Qaghan and Illig Qaghan who were brothers and who successively served as khans. Despite Ashina Simo's royal lineage, it was said that on account of his appearance, which appeared more Sogdian than Turkic, Ashina Duojishi and Ashina Chuluo both suspected him of being born out of an adulterous relationship, and therefore did not entrust him with great authorities. Throughout their reigns, he only carried the title of Jiabi Tegin (夾畢特勒), and could not be a general. According to Suzuki Kosetsu, it was a political situation created by Issik Qaghan's descendants, who did not want a succession crisis. In 624, during a dispute that the Eastern Turks had with China's Tang dynasty, which was then a vassal of the Eastern Turks, as part of the negotiations, Ashina Duobi sent Ashina Simo to meet with Emperor Gaozu of Tang, and Emperor Gaozu honored Ashina Simo with the title of Prince of Heshun.

Late in Ashina Duobi's reign, with Tang strengthening and Eastern Tujue weakening due to internal problems, many of Eastern Tujue tribes surrendered to Tang, and while apparently Tang made overtures to Ashina Simo, Ashina Simo remained faithful to Ashina Duobi. His faithfulness to Ashina Duobi continued even after Emperor Gaozu's son Emperor Taizong launched a major attack commanded by the general Li Jing in 629—such that when Tang forces captured Ashina Duobi in 630, Ashina Simo remained with him and was captured with him. Emperor Taizong was impressed with Ashina Simo's faithfulness and made him a general and a commandant, in command of the people formerly directly under Ashina Duobi. He also created Ashina Simo the Prince of Huaihua in 23 July 630.

== As khagan ==
Emperor Taizong initially settled the Eastern Turk people within Tang borders, but after a failed assassination attempt against him by Ashina Duojishi's son Ashina Jiesheshuai in 639, he changed his mind. On 13 August 639, he made Ashina Simo (who was by this point had also been given the imperial clan surname Li and was therefore also known as Li Simo) Yiminishuqilibi Khan (Qilibi Khan) and ordered the settled Turks to follow Qilibi Khan north of the Yellow River to settle between the Great Wall and the Gobi Desert. The Göktürks, fearful of the Xueyantuo – a former Eastern Turkic vassal that had become powerful and taken over the Eastern Turks' former territory – initially refused. Emperor Taizong thereafter issued an edict to the Xueyantuo's Zhenzhu Khan, Yi'nan, delivered by his official Guo Siben (郭嗣本), ordering the Xueyantuo not to attack the newly reestablished Eastern Turks. Yi'nan, while displeased at the development, initially agreed. Emperor Taizong then carried out a formal creation ceremony for Qilibi Khan, presided by the great general Li Xiaogong, and also held an imperial feast in Qilibi Khan's honor. He made the Eastern Tujue princes Ashina Zhong (阿史那忠) and Ashina Nishu as Qilibi Khan's assistants.

In the spring of 641, Qilibi Khan's people finally crossed the Yellow River, and he established his headquarters at Dingxiang (定襄, in modern Hohhot, Inner Mongolia). He was said to have 30,000 households, 40,000 troops, and 90,000 warhorses. He submitted a petition to Emperor Taizong, stating:

I have received blessings that I did not deserve, and I lead this tribe as its chief. I hope that for generations, we will continue to serve as a watchdog outside the empire's north door, guarding it. But we are still currently weak, and if Xueyantuo should attack us, we might not be able to stand. If that happens, I request permission to withdraw within the Great Wall.

Emperor Taizong agreed. In the winter 641 of, with Yi'nan anticipating that Emperor Taizong would soon be offering sacrifices to heaven and earth at Mount Tai and would take his soldiers with him, he believed that he could destroy Qilibi Khan quickly. He therefore had his son Dadu (大度) head Xueyantuo troops, along with conscripted troops from vassal tribes Tongluo (同羅), Pugu (僕骨), Huige, Mohe, and Xi (霫), launch a major attack on the Eastern Turks. Qilibi Khan could not resist the attack, and withdrew within the Great Wall to Shuo Prefecture (朔州, roughly modern Shuozhou, Shanxi) and sought emergency aid. Emperor Taizong sent the generals Zhang Jian, Li Shiji, Li Daliang, Zhang Shigui (張士貴), and Li Xiyu (李襲譽), to attack the Xueyantuo to assist Qilibi Khan, with Li Shiji in overall command. Around the new year 642, Li Shiji dealt a major defeat to Dadu, who fled after heavy casualties. Emperor Taizong, while sending an emissary to rebuke Yi'nan, did not take further actions against the Xueyantuo at this point. It was said that Yi'nan continued to be unhappy with Eastern Turks' existence, and continued to harass them. When Emperor Taizong sent further emissaries to order Yi'nan from attacking Eastern Tujue, Yi'nan's response was:

How do I not dare to follow the Emperor's edict? But the Tujue people are treacherous and should not be trusted. Before the destruction of their state, they invaded China each year and continued to kill thousands of people. I thought that, after the emperor defeated them, he would make them into slaves and reward them to the Chinese people, but instead the emperor raised them like his own sons and showed much grace to them. Despite this, Ashina Jiesheshuai rebelled. They look like humans, but have hearts like beasts, and should not be treated as humans. I have received much grace from the emperor, and I have nothing to repay him for. I am willing to kill the Tujue for China.

Around the new year 645, Qilibi Khan's people, apparently under Xueyantuo pressure, collapsed and abandoned Qilibi Khan. (At this time, Emperor Taizong was deep in his preparation to attack Goguryeo, and therefore, if the Xueyantuo had attacked, might not have been able to protect the Eastern Turks.) They crossed the Yellow River south, seeking to be settled among Sheng (勝州, also in modern Hohhot, but south of the Yellow River) and Xia (夏州, roughly modern Yulin, Shaanxi) Prefectures. Despite officials' opposition, Emperor Taizong agreed, and did so. Qilibi Khan, with his state in shambles, also returned to China, and was again made a Tang general, ending the Tang's attempt to recreate Eastern Turkic Khaganate as a vassal.

== After return to Tang ==
Emperor Taizong soon launched a major attack on Goguryeo, and Ashina Simo followed Emperor Taizong on the campaign. During siege of Baekam (백암성), Ashina Simo was injured by an arrow, and it was said that Emperor Taizong personally sucked the pus out of his wound, which greatly inspired the soldiers. Taizong himself also tended to the injury of another Turkic General who was wounded during the war against Goguryeo, Qibi Heli. It was said that after Ashina Simo returned to the Tang capital Chang'an (implying that this is after the end of the campaign in the fall of 645), he died. He was buried with great honors near the tomb of Emperor Taizong's wife Empress Zhangsun, where Emperor Taizong would eventually be buried himself.

== Physical Appearance ==
The Old Book of Tang described Ashina Simo's appearance as resembling Sogdians more than Göktürks. Simo's Sogdian-like appearance aroused suspicion towards him from Khagans Shibi and Chuluo and prevented Simo from becoming Shad.

Simo was a relative of Xieli. Because his face was like that of the ‘barbarian (huren 胡人)’ and not like that of the Tujue, Shibi [Khagan] and Chuluo [Khagan] were doubtful of his being one of the Ashina. Thus although he always held the title of Jiabi Teqin [夾畢特勤; ms. 夾畢特勒] (Note: 特勤 Teqin is miscopied as 特勒 Tele) during Chuluo and Xieli's time, he could not become a shad (she 設) in command of the army till the end.

== In popular culture ==
- Portrayed by Im Byung-ki in 2006-2007 SBS TV series Yeon Gaesomun.
- Portrayed by Yuan Hong in the 2012 Hunan TV series Secret History of Princess Taiping.
- Portrayed by Leo Wu as Ashile sun in 2021 Chinese historical drama [The long ballad] (TV series)

== See also ==
- Emperor Taizong's campaign against Eastern Tujue
- Turks in the Tang military

== Sources ==
- Old Book of Tang, vol. 194, part 1.
- New Book of Tang, vol. 215, part 1.
- Zizhi Tongjian, vols. 191, 193, 195, 196, 197.

Qilibi Khan Ashina Clan
| Preceded by Illig Qaghan | Khagan of the Eastern Turkic Khaganate; 639–645 | Succeeded by Chebi Qaghan |
