= Xiong Damu =

Xiong Damu (熊大木) (fl. sixteenth century) was a Ming dynasty man who compiled a number of relatively popular historical saga novels.

Modern literature historians believe he was a barely literate bookstore keeper who simply copied and pasted stories from different books in all of his novels. He would arrange fictional materials on historical characters that he found from different sources chronologically, and use historical books to fill in any gaps.
