= Zhang Jian (Tang noble) =

Zhang Jian (Chinese: 張儉; pinyin: Zhāng Jiǎn; 594 - 653), courtesy name Shiyue (師約), was a relative of the Tang dynasty emperors who became a duke.

He was a great-nephew of Emperor Gaozu of Tang, the founder of the dynasty. He did good service in aiding the Emperor to consolidate his power; and on one occasion rode alone into the camp of a revolted tribe of Turko-Scythians, and succeeded in gaining their submission. He held many important posts, and was ennobled as Duke of Wancheng Commandery (皖城郡公). Posthumously named Mi (密).
