= Ansi City =

Ancient fortified city in Liaoning, China

Coordinates: 40°46′50″N 122°46′41″E

Ansi City (Chinese: 安市城; Goguryeo: 安寸忽; Korean: 안시성; Hanja: 安市城), also known as Ansi Fortress, was a Goguryeo fortified city in present-day Liaoning province, China. The city was founded in early 4th century after Goguryeo conquered the area, and received its name from a Han dynasty prefecture of the same name. The ruins of the city are identified with a site at Yingchengzi (营城子), 7.5 kilometres (4.7 mi) to the southeast of Haicheng. Ansi was a major city of the Goguryeo and the scene of a major siege and battle between the Goguryeo and Tang dynasty China in 645 CE.

== Siege of Ansi ==
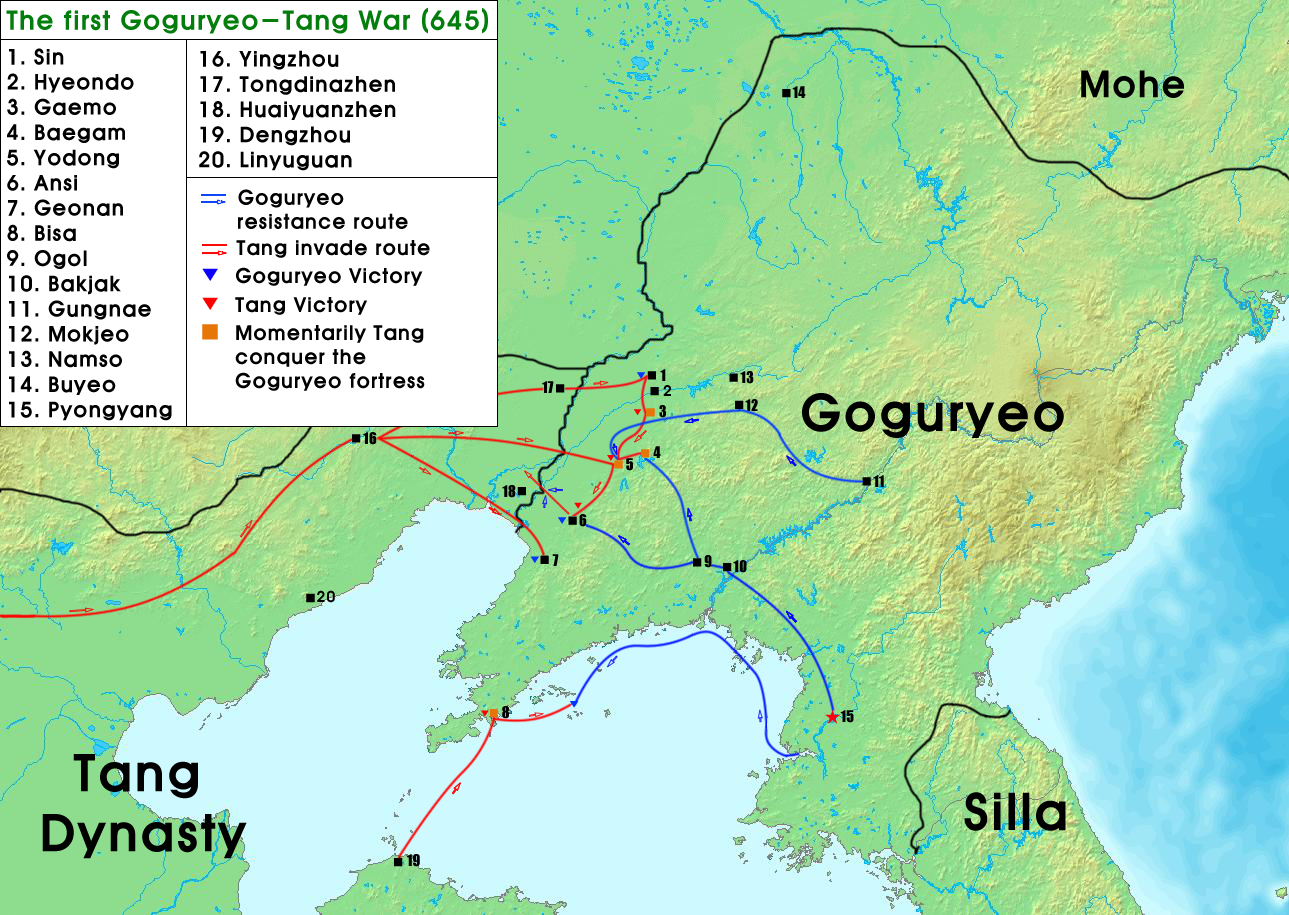
First campaign in the Goguryeo-Tang War.

The Goguryeo controlled an area that covered the north part of the Korean Peninsula, most of Liaoyang and Jilin province in modern China and part of what is now Primorsky Krai in Russia. They neighboured Silla to the south and China to the west. In 643 CE, the Goguryeo attacked Silla who then appealed to the Chinese emperor for help. In response, Emperor Taizong of Tang sent an army to attack the Goguryeo in 645. This invasion was initially successful with the capture of Liaodong and Baicun Goguryeo cities by the Tang. Following this victory, there was discussion as to whether to march directly to Pyongyang, the Goguryeo capital city, or to face the Goguryeo army in the Liaodong region. After the battle of Mount Zhubi, the Goguryeo fell back on their city of Ansi and the Tang army pursued.

Emperor Taizong next prepared to put Ansi under siege, but he had reservations about it. When he discussed the matter with Li Shiji, he stated:

I heard that Ansi has strong natural defenses and a strong garrison. Its defending general is also both intelligent and brave. When the Mangniji committed treason, he refused to submit to the Mangniji. The Mangniji attacked him but could not capture the city, and therefore had to leave him in charge of Ansi. Rather, Geonan [(建安, in modern Yingkou, Liaoning)] has a weak defense force. You should attack Geonan first, and once Geonan falls, Ansi will be in our belly. This is, like the Art of War stated, "Some cities do not need to be attacked."

The name of the defending general of Ansi has been lost to history, but is traditionally rendered in Korean popular accounts as Yang Manch'un, even though some Korean historical sources indicated that the name was lost.

Li Shiji disagreed, however, arguing that as Geonan was to Ansi's south and that the main Tang food supply was coming from Liaodong, that if he attacked Geonan first, the defenders of Ansi would try to cut his supply lines. Emperor Taizong agreed, and Li Shiji began to siege Ansi.

When Emperor Taizong and Li Shiji arrived at Ansi, it was said that the Ansi defenders, upon seeing the banner of the Tang emperor, began to yell insults from the walls. Emperor Taizong was insulted, and Li Shiji received permission to slaughter the city's male inhabitants when it fell—which led to the Ansi defenders fighting even harder. Li Shiji was unable to capture the city for some time. Go Yeonsu and Go Hyezin, who had by now accepted Tang titles, suggested:

Since we, your slaves, have now submitted to the empire, we have to give you all we have. We hope that you, Son of Heaven, can quickly complete your task so that we can again meet our families. The people of Ansi, in order to protect their families, are fighting so hard that it is difficult to capture it immediately. However, as we had commanded more than 100,000 Goguryeo men and yet collapsed at your banner, the people of Goguryeo have already lost morale. The defending general of Ogol [(烏骨, in modern Dandong, Liaoning)] is senile and incompetent and would surely not be able to stand against you. If you move your army against Ogol instead, it will fall the day that you arrive there, and then all of the cities on the way to Pyongyang will crumble as well. Once you collect the supplies in these cities, march forward, and Pyongyang will not be able to stand.

Some other officials also suggested:

Zhang Liang is at Beisha. If you order him to rendezvous with us, he will arrive in two days, and with the entire Goguryeo state in fear, we can then capture Ogol, cross the Yalu River, and attack Pyongyang, and we will be easily successful.

Emperor Taizong was inclined to accept these proposals, but Zhangsun opposed, stating:

The nature of a campaign commanded by a Son of Heaven is different from the nature of a campaign commanded by a mere general. Right now, there are still more than 100,000 barbarian soldiers at Geonan and Sinseong [(新城, in modern Fushun)]. If we attack Ogol, the armies in those two cities will attack our rear. It will be more secure to first capture Ansi and Geonan, and then march deep into Goguryeo territory.

Emperor Taizong agreed with Zhangsun and did not head toward Ogol.

As the siege continued, on an occasion, when Emperor Taizong heard the sounds of chickens and pigs coming out of the city, he opined to Li Shiji that it must be that the Goguryeo defenders were preparing an assault and were slaughtering animals beforehand to feast on them. Li Shiji therefore prepared for a night assault, which came that very night. Emperor Taizong himself led soldiers to repel the assault, and the Goguryeo forces withdrew within the city again.

Meanwhile, Li Daozong was building a dirt mound to the southeast of the city to use as an attack mechanism, and in response, the Ansi defenders added to the height of the wall to the southeast. This process continued for 60 days, and eventually, the dirt mound got so high that from it, one could easily see inside the city. Li Daozong had his officer Fu Fu'ai (傅伏愛) take position on the dirt mound. Suddenly, the mound had a partial collapse and fell onto the city walls, and the walls collapsed as well. At this moment, Fu, for reasons unexplained in history, left his position, and the Goguryeo forces took the opportunity to attack and capture the dirt mound, and instead used it as part of the defensive bulwarks. Emperor Taizong, in anger, executed Fu in public and ordered a heavy assault on the dirt mound, but could not capture it within three days. Li Daozong bared his feet and begged punishment, but Emperor Taizong pardoned him.

Meanwhile, winter was approaching, and the grass was drying up. Also, the food supplies were running out. On October 13, 645, Emperor Taizong ordered a withdrawal. He gave a demonstration ceremony next to Ansi before withdrawing.

== In popular culture ==
The South Korean film The Great Battle (2018) is based on the battle of Ansi Fortress in 645 CE.
