= Dengta =

Dengta 灯塔市
- County-level city
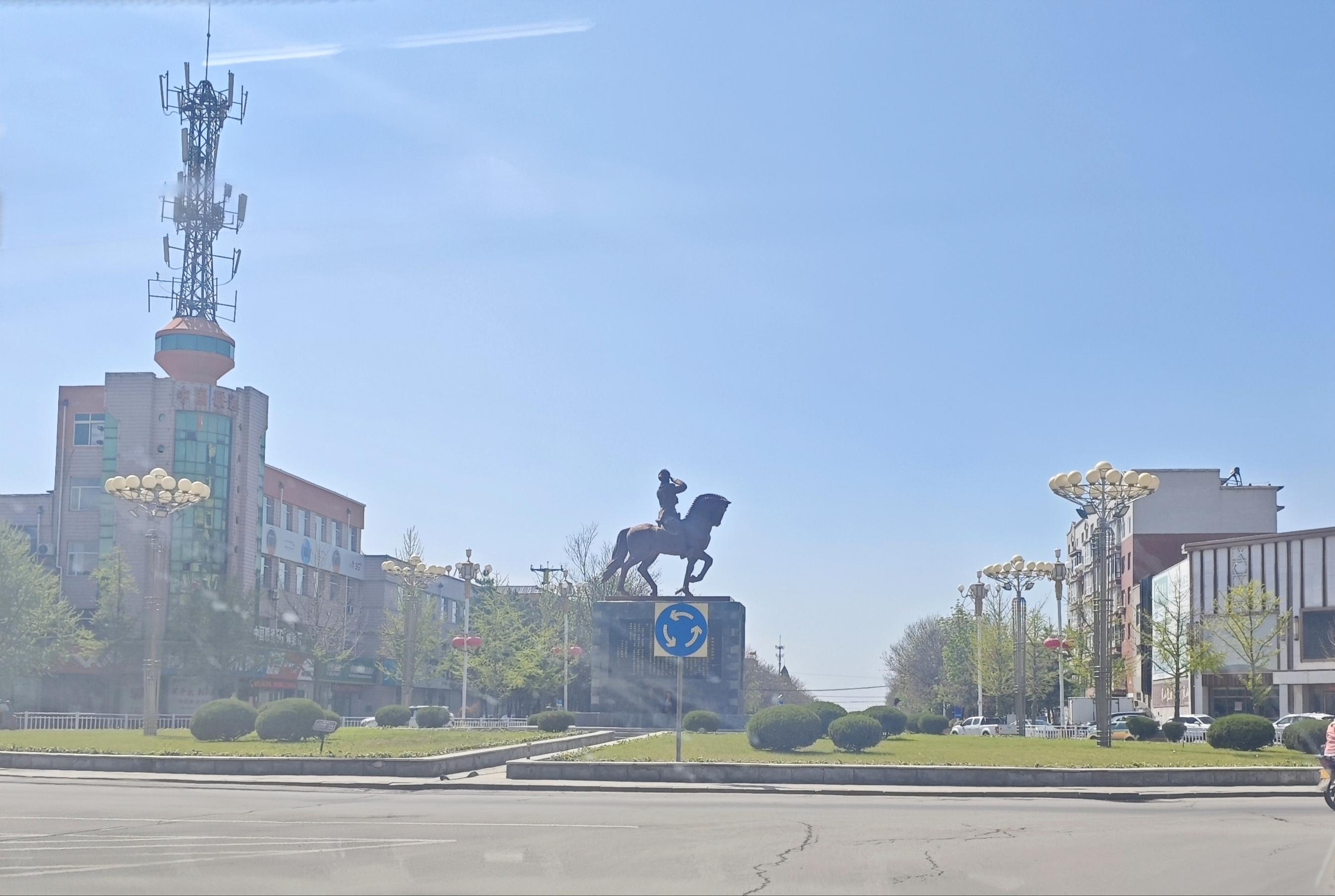
- Zhaolin Square, Dengta City

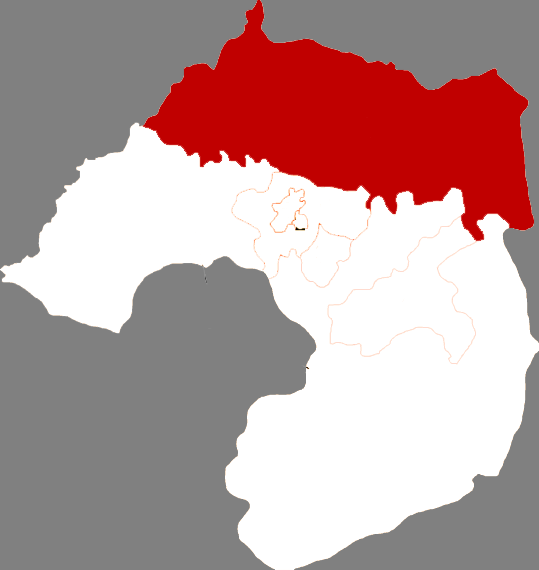
- Location in Liaoyang

- Location in Liaoning
- Coordinates: 41°26′N 123°20′E
- Country: People's Republic of China
- Province: Liaoning
- Prefecture-level city: Liaoyang

Area
  - County-level city: 1,166.0 km^{2} (450.2 sq mi)
- Elevation: 44 m (144 ft)

Population (2020 census)
  - County-level city: 359,401
  - Density: 308.23/km^{2} (798.32/sq mi)
  - Urban: 359,401
- Time zone: UTC+8 (China Standard)

Dengta (simplified Chinese: 灯塔; traditional Chinese: 燈塔; pinyin: Dēngtǎ; lit. 'Lighthouse') is a city in east-central Liaoning province in Northeast China. It is located between Liaoyang, which oversees Dengta and lies 22 kilometers (14 mi) to the southwest, and Shenyang, the provincial capital which lies nearly double that distance to the northeast.

== Administrative Divisions ==
There are three subdistricts, 12 towns and one township under the city's administration.

Subdistricts:

- Wanbaoqiao Subdistrict (万宝桥街道), Yantai Subdistrict (烟台街道), Gucheng Subdistrict (古城街道)

Towns:

- Dengta Town (灯塔镇), Huazi (铧子镇), Zhangtaizi (张台子镇), Xidayao (西大窑镇), Tong'erpu (佟二堡镇), Shendanbao (沈旦堡镇), Liutiaozhai (柳条寨镇), Ximafeng (西马峰镇), Wangjia (王家镇), Liuhezi (柳河子镇), Luodatai (罗大台镇), Dahenan (大河南镇)

The only township is Jiguanshan Township (鸡冠山乡)

== Climate ==
Climate data for Dengta, elevation 42 m (138 ft), (1991–2020 normals, extremes 1991–present)
Month	Jan	Feb	Mar	Apr	May	Jun	Jul	Aug	Sep	Oct	Nov	Dec	Year
Record high °C (°F)	7.5 (45.5)	14.2 (57.6)	23.2 (73.8)	30.4 (86.7)	35.9 (96.6)	36.4 (97.5)	36.2 (97.2)	37.1 (98.8)	31.6 (88.9)	30.4 (86.7)	19.8 (67.6)	11.1 (52.0)	37.1 (98.8)
Mean daily maximum °C (°F)	−4.3 (24.3)	0.5 (32.9)	7.7 (45.9)	17.1 (62.8)	24.1 (75.4)	27.6 (81.7)	29.5 (85.1)	28.8 (83.8)	24.6 (76.3)	16.7 (62.1)	6.3 (43.3)	−1.9 (28.6)	14.7 (58.5)
Daily mean °C (°F)	−10.5 (13.1)	−5.5 (22.1)	2.1 (35.8)	11.0 (51.8)	18.1 (64.6)	22.5 (72.5)	25.0 (77.0)	23.9 (75.0)	18.2 (64.8)	10.4 (50.7)	1.0 (33.8)	−7.4 (18.7)	9.1 (48.3)
Mean daily minimum °C (°F)	−15.7 (3.7)	−10.7 (12.7)	−2.9 (26.8)	5.0 (41.0)	12.2 (54.0)	17.6 (63.7)	20.9 (69.6)	19.7 (67.5)	12.9 (55.2)	5.1 (41.2)	−3.5 (25.7)	−12.1 (10.2)	4.0 (39.3)
Record low °C (°F)	−30.4 (−22.7)	−23.9 (−11.0)	−15.9 (3.4)	−5.4 (22.3)	0.1 (32.2)	5.0 (41.0)	13.0 (55.4)	6.7 (44.1)	0.7 (33.3)	−8.1 (17.4)	−18.5 (−1.3)	−27.7 (−17.9)	−30.4 (−22.7)
Average precipitation mm (inches)	5.8 (0.23)	9.1 (0.36)	15.6 (0.61)	34.9 (1.37)	60.8 (2.39)	92.3 (3.63)	170.3 (6.70)	154.3 (6.07)	60.4 (2.38)	45.7 (1.80)	23.9 (0.94)	11.1 (0.44)	684.2 (26.92)
Average precipitation days (≥ 0.1 mm)	3.4	3.4	4.6	6.8	9.2	11.3	11.6	11.2	7.0	6.6	5.3	4.4	84.8
Average snowy days	5.6	4.6	3.9	1.2	0	0	0	0	0	0.5	4.2	5.6	25.6
Average relative humidity (%)	62	56	53	50	54	67	78	81	72	65	64	64	64
Mean monthly sunshine hours	182.2	193.6	230.8	230.1	255.6	226.2	197.5	208.2	227.2	206.7	166.6	163.6	2,488.3
Percentage possible sunshine	61	64	62	57	57	50	43	49	61	61	57	58	57
Source: China Meteorological Administrationall-time extreme temperature
