= Kyrgyz Khaganate =

840–925 Turkic khaganate in East Asia

Kyrgyz Khaganate 𐰴𐰃𐰻𐰴𐰕:𐰅𐰠 Qïrğïz El (Note: The Kyrgyz Khaganate may have referred to itself as the State of the Kyrgyz (Old Turkic: 𐰴𐰃𐰻𐰴𐰕:𐰅𐰠, romanized: Qïrğïz El). The expression Sacred Realm (Old Turkic: 𐱅𐰭𐰼𐰃:𐰅𐰠, romanized: Täŋri El) is attested in several Yenisei inscriptions, including E1, E3, E13, E14, E16, E44, E73, and E147. It often occurs with possessive and case suffixes, as in To My Sacred Realm (Old Turkic: 𐱅𐰭𐰼𐰃:𐰅𐰠𐰢𐰚𐰀, romanized: Täŋri Elimke).)
- 840–1207
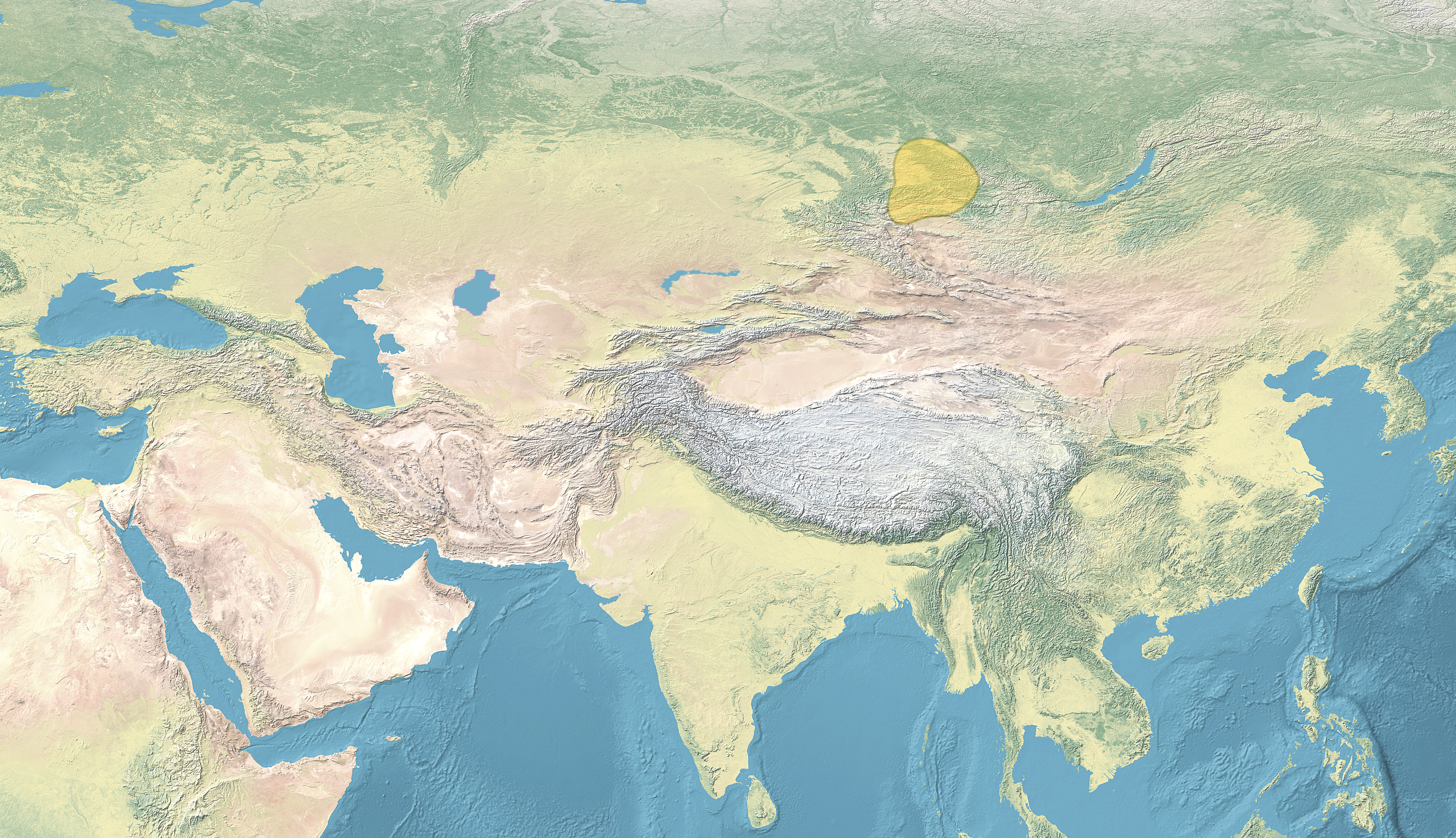
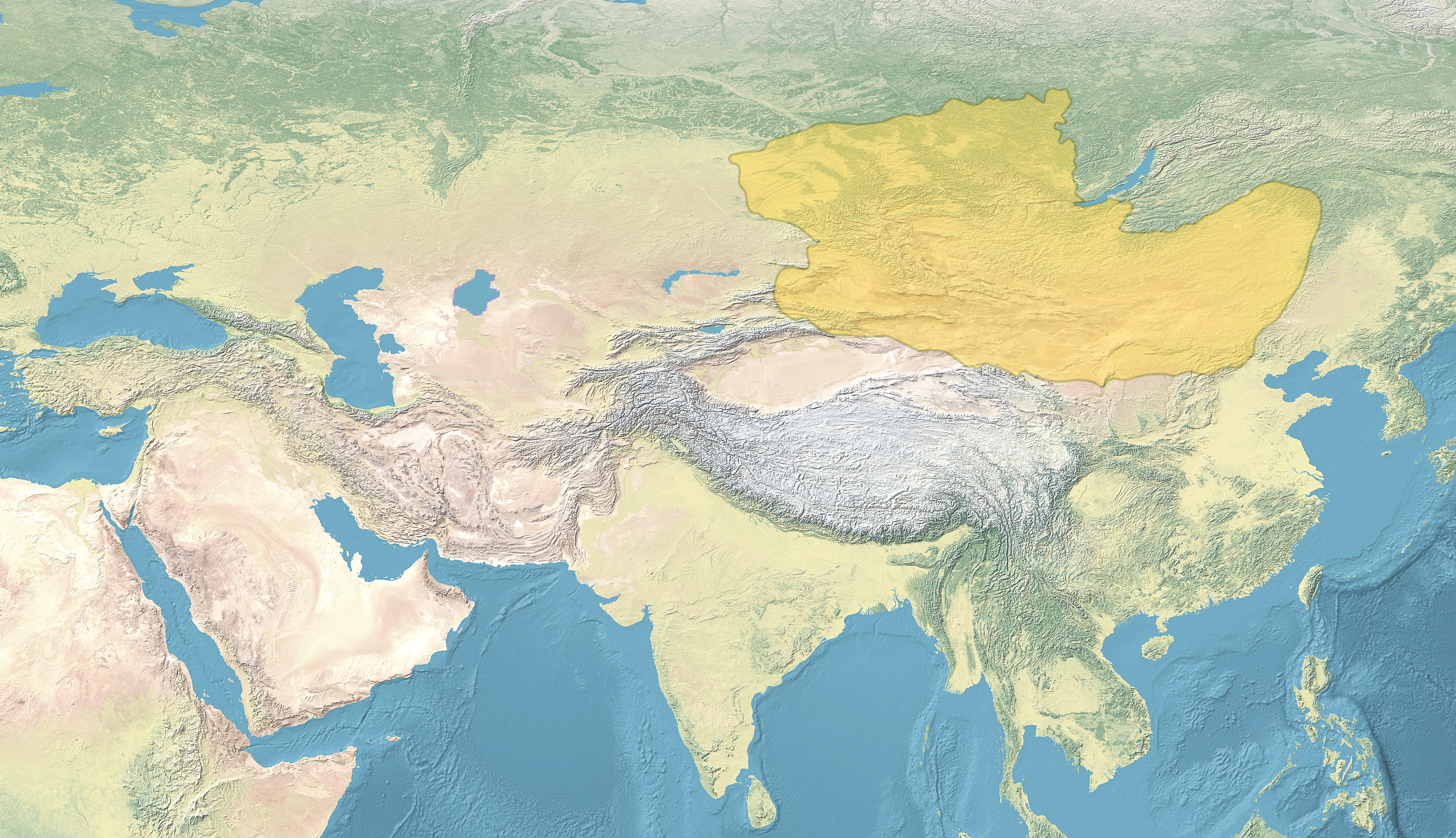
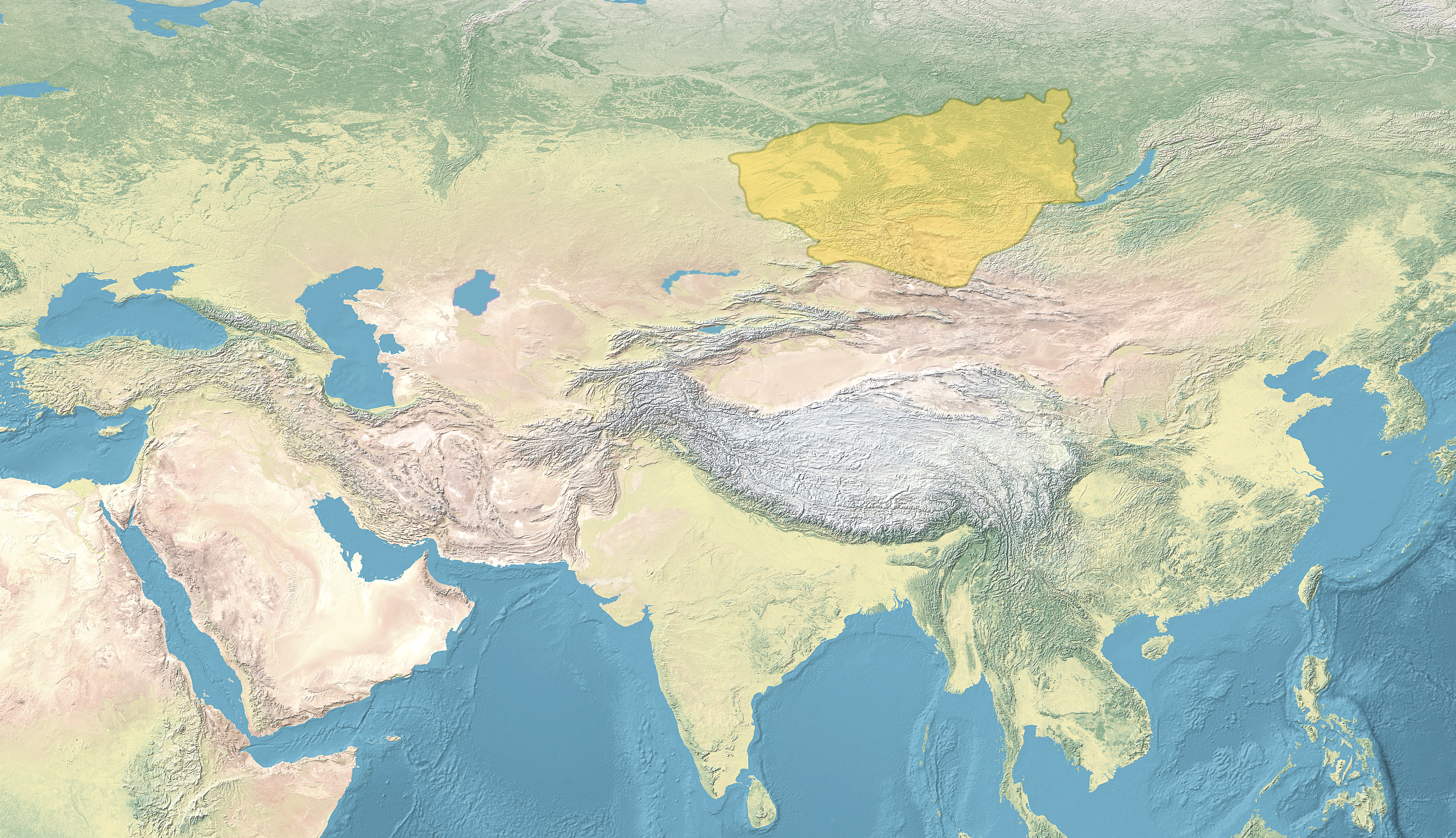
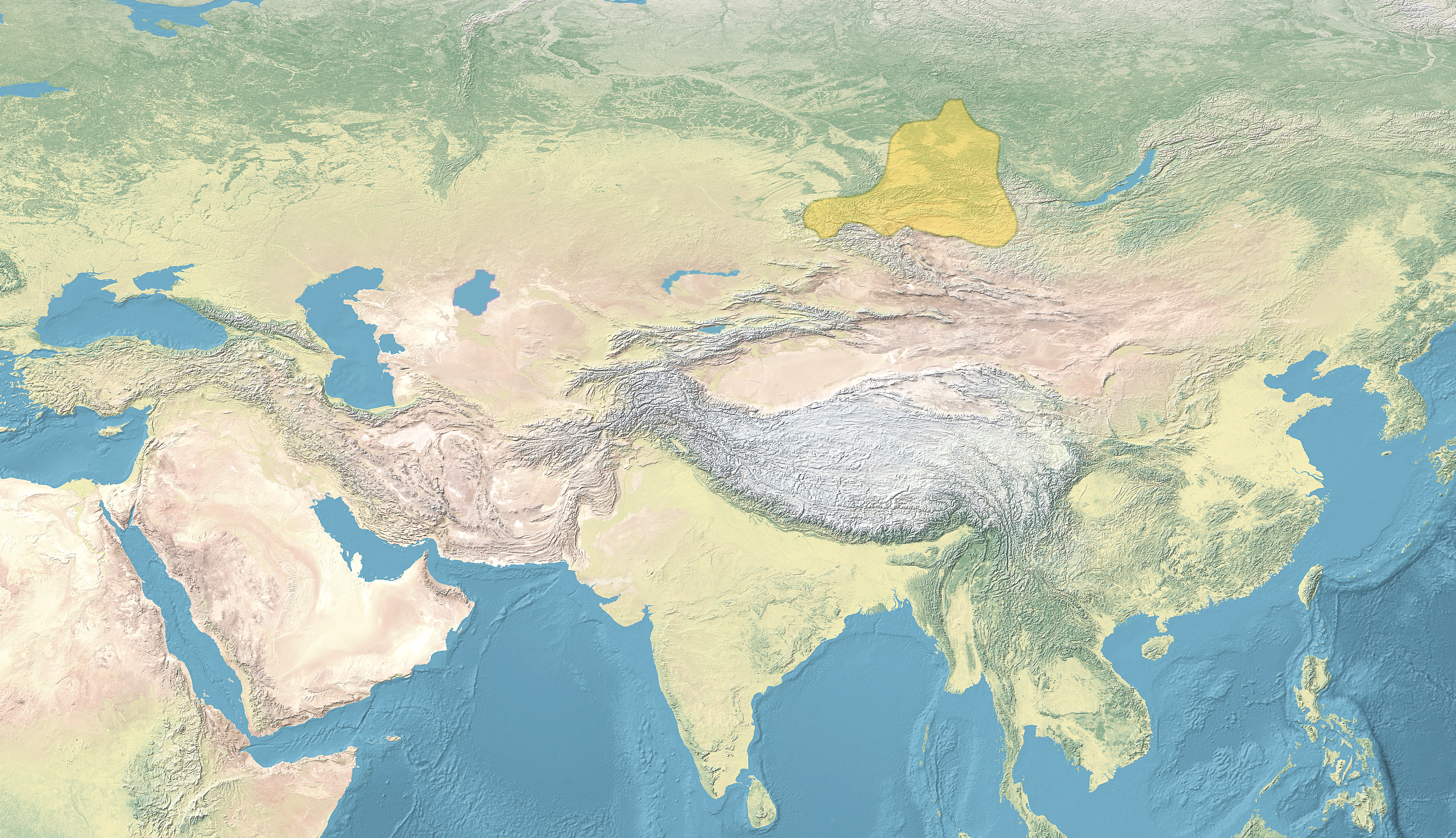
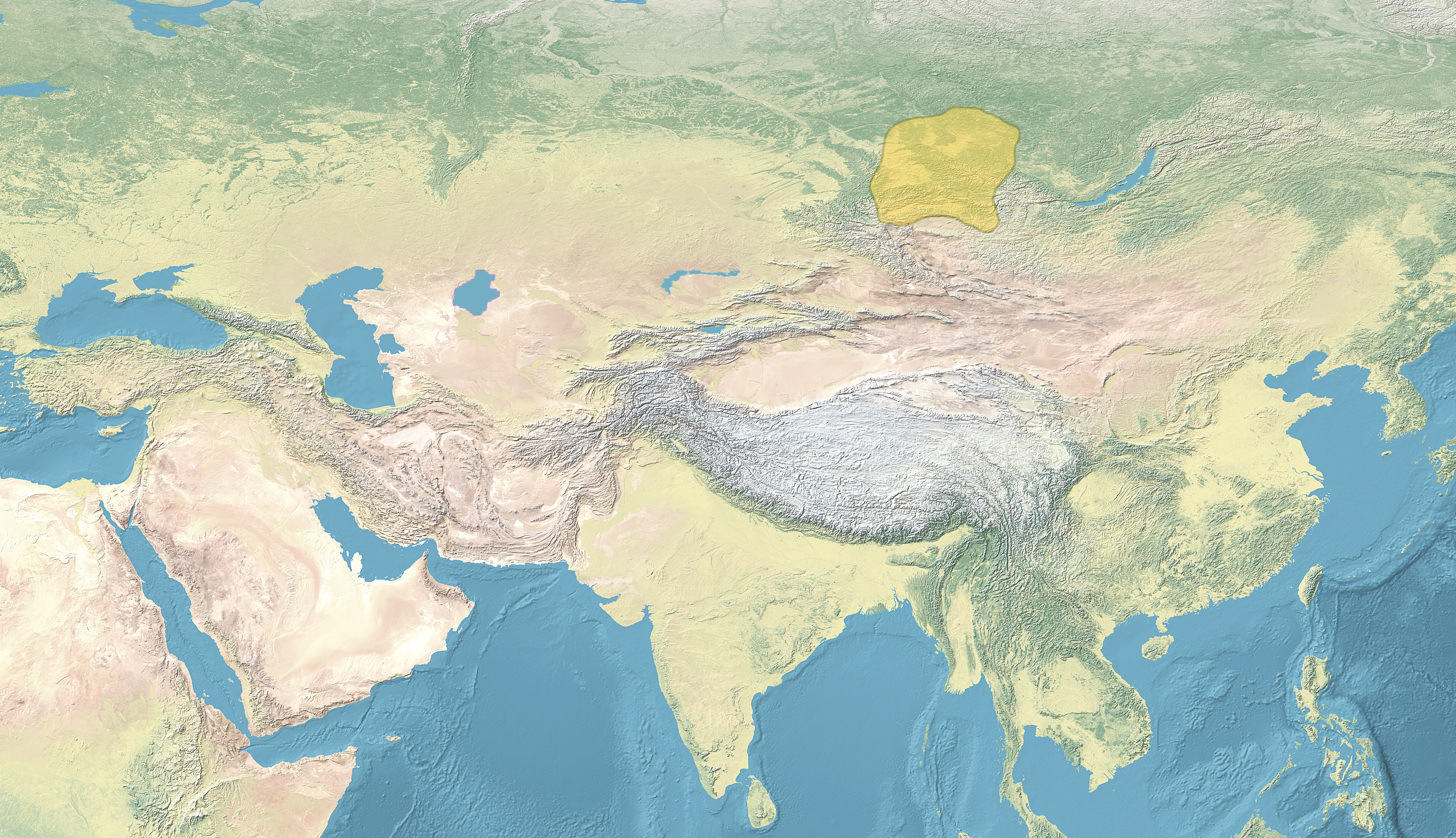

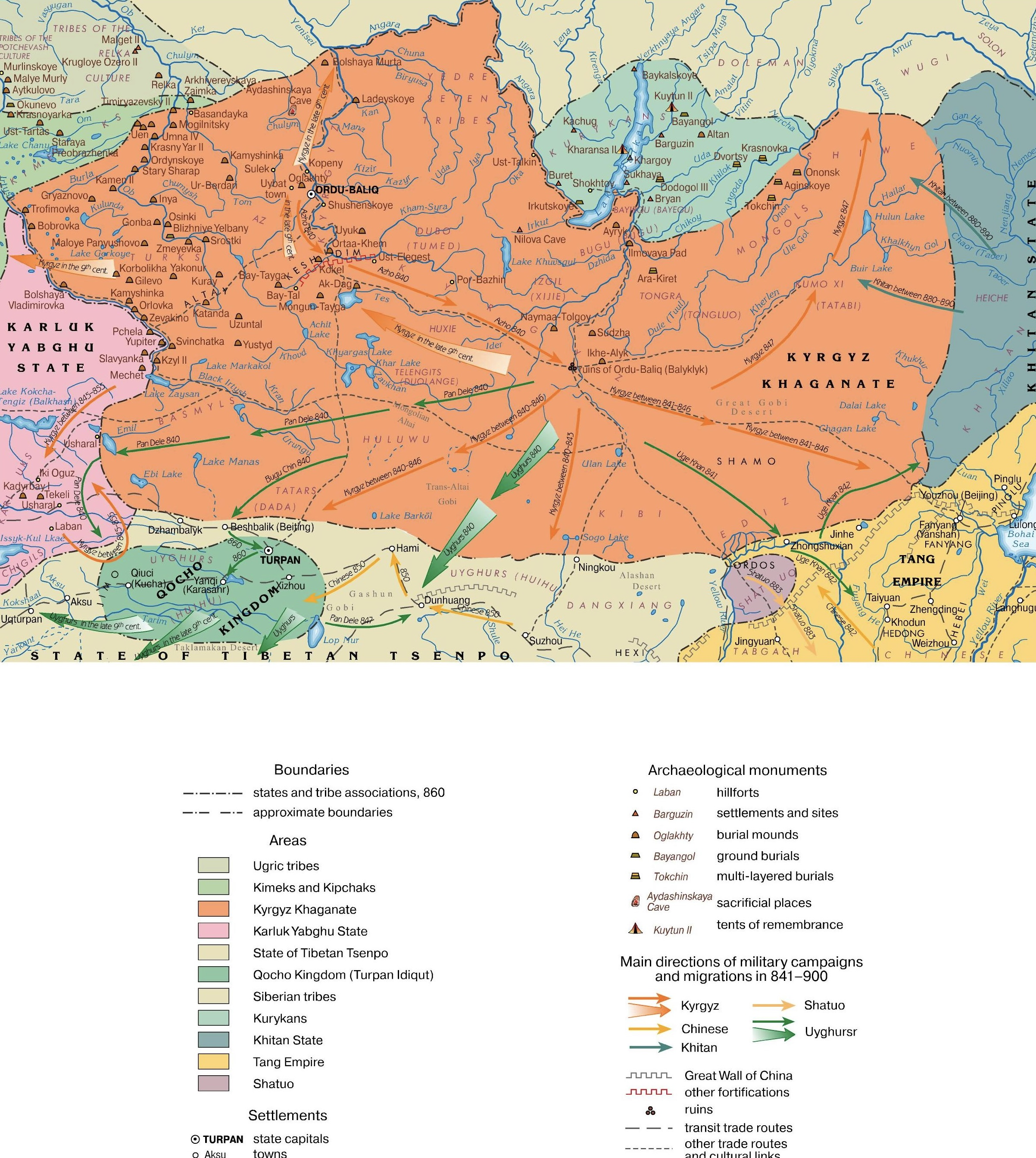
- Map of the Kyrgyz Khaganate in 860. Andrey Astaykin
- Status: Khaganate (Nomadic empire)
- Capital: A settlement around Uybat River; Ordu-Baliq (since 840); A settlement in Tuva, probably Kemičket (since 925); Khagan-Kirghiz (since the mid-12th century)
- Common languages: Orkhon Turkic language (official); Old Turkic language
- Religion: Tengrism (official); Manichaeism (official after conquest) (Note: As the Kyrgyz Khaganate rose after Aču Khagan, other beliefs began to enter the state. Thus, as Manichaeism spread, some Kyrgyz khagans began to use the title "Khagan of Light" in relation to themselves, and monumental Manichaean temples began to be built in the state and Manichaean monasteries.); Buddhism; Nestorian Christianity
- Demonym: Yenisei Kyrgyz (Qïrğïz bodun)
- Government: Monarchy
- Khagan (īnāl)
  - 693–711: Bars Bek (first)
  - 711–758: Unknown khan(s) (Note: In Turkic society, a khan is more like a chieftain or a king rather than an imperial khagan as a regional power.)
  - 758–795: Bilge Tong Erkin
  - 795-847: Aču Khagan (as khagan after 840)
  - 847–866: Ïnǧu Khagan
  - 866–925: Unknown khagan(s)
  - 925–1207: Unknown khan(s) (Note: After the tenth century, there is little additional information regarding the Kyrgyz until their absorption into the Mongol Empire in the thirteenth century.)
- History
  - Established: 840
  - Disestablished: 1207
Preceded by	Succeeded by
Second Turkic Khaganate; Uyghur Khaganate	Liao dynasty

The Kyrgyz Khaganate (also Yenisei Kyrgyz Khaganate or Kirghiz Khaganate) was a Turkic khaganate centered in southern Siberia. After the defeat of the Uyghur Khaganate in the hands of the Kyrgyz in 840, they gained political prestige and, for a short period until the mid-10th century (c. 925), established a nominal supremacy on the steppe.

Many scholars have assumed that the Kyrgyz extended their control over the Mongolian Plateau after 840. However, as Michael Drompp observes, the Kyrgyz remained in their Yenisei homelands and there is no evidence of a permanent migration to the Tian Shan or beyond.

Peter Golden likewise emphasizes that their domination was nominal and military in character and that they did not establish a centralized empire like the Gökturks or Uyghurs. In another work, Golden stresses that their power was real enough to defeat the Uighurs, but they did not create a lasting empire. Their authority was limited to the Yenisei region. According to the Cambridge History of Early Inner Asia, their ascendancy did not translate into territorial expansion.

== Periodization ==
- 693: Bars Bek founded the khanate
- 711: The Second Turkic Khaganate won the Battle of Sayan Mountains
- 758: The Kyrgyz Khanate submit to the Uyghur Khaganate
- 839: Kulug Bagha (Julu Mohe) and Aču Khagan allied against Uyghur Khaganate
- 840: The Kyrgyz Khaganate conquered the Uyghur Khaganate and hold Ötuken and Ordu-Baliq
- 840–925: Imperial (khaganate) period
- 925–1207: After imperial period

== History ==
The earliest records of Kyrgyz Khaganate were written during the Tang dynasty. The Kyrgyz did not keep reliable written records during this period.

Before 201 BC, the Xiongnu ruler Modu Chanyu conquered the Yenisei Kyrgyz, then known to Chinese as Gekun (鬲昆), along with the Hunyu (渾庾), Qushe (屈射), Dingling (丁零), and Xinli (薪犁).

In 50 BC, Xiongnu chanyu Zhizhi defeated the Wusun, Wujie (Oguzes?), Dinglings and Jiankun (Kyrgyz). During those times, Kyrgyz people lived in the Borohoro Mountains and the Manasi River valley on east Tengir-Too, about 7,000 li (4,000 km (2,500 mi)) west of Ordos – the center of the Xiongnu's territory.

In Chinese historiography, the Kyrgyz' endonym was first transcribed as Gekun (or Ko-kun; Chinese: 鬲昆) or Jiankun (or Chien-kun; Chinese: 堅昆) in Records of the Grand Historian and Book of Han, respectively. other transcriptions are Jiegu (結骨), Hegu (紇骨), Hegusi (紇扢斯), Hejiasi (紇戛斯), Hugu (護骨), Qigu (契骨), Juwu (居勿), and Xiajiasi (黠戛斯), Peter Golden reconstructs underlying *Qïrğïz < *Qïrqïz< *Qïrqïŕ and suggests a derivation from Old Turkic qïr 'gray' (horse color) plus suffix -q(X)ŕ/ğ(X)ŕ ~ k(X)z/g(X)z.

They were largely subordinate to the Göktürks from 560s to 700s. Kyrgyz khan Bars Bek was a brother-in-law of Bilge Qaghan. His son ruled the Kyrgyzs after Bars Bek's defeat at the hands of Qapaghan in 710. After the downfall of the Göktürks, they submitted to the Uyghurs. Their leader Bayanchur killed the Kyrgyz leader and appointed a new Kyrgyz khan named Bilge Tong Erkin (毗伽頓頡斤).

=== Bars Bek ===
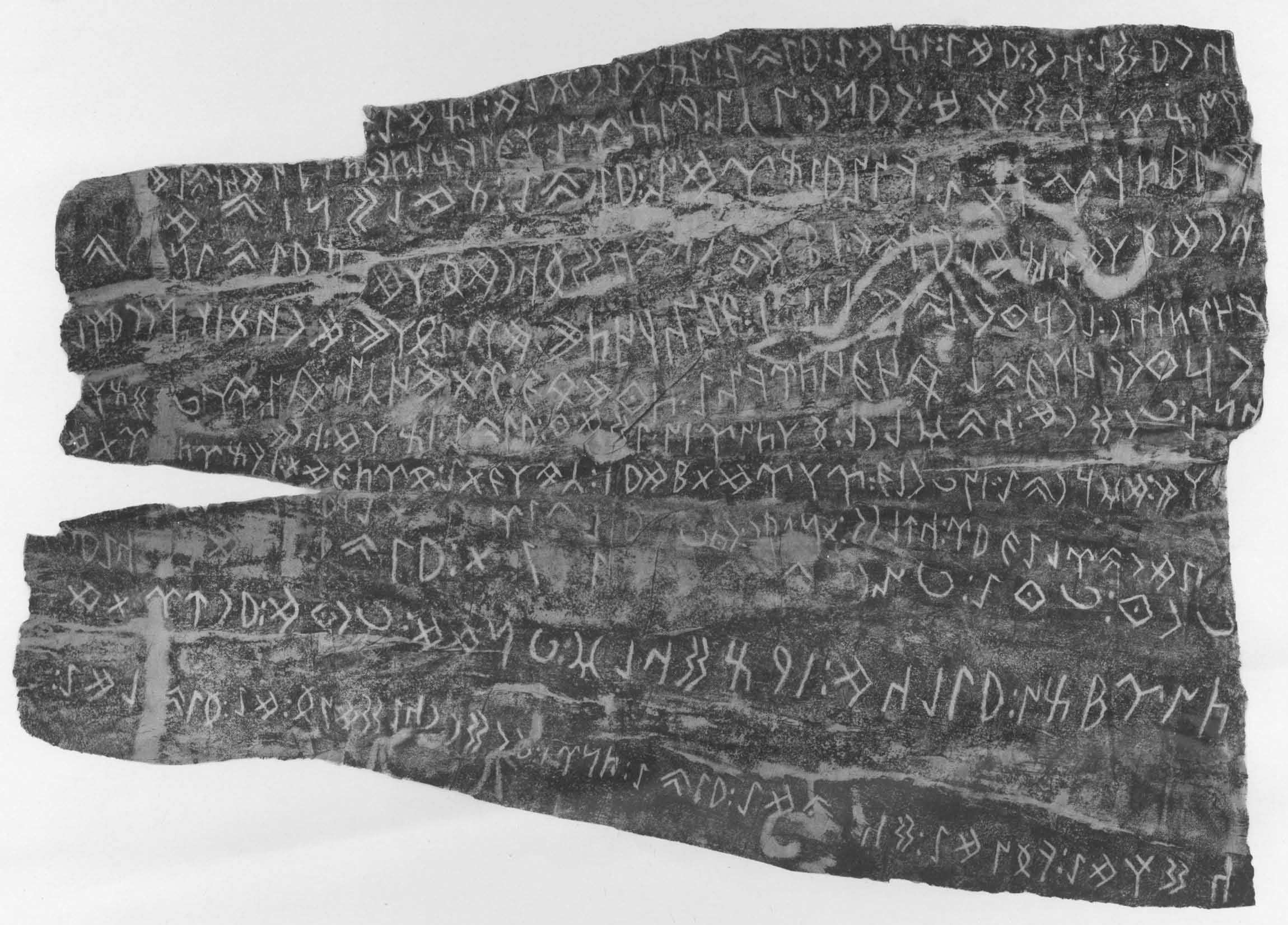
Elegest inscription

After an unsuccessful campaign against the Kyrgyz in 693, the leader of the Göktürk Second Turkic Khaganate, Qapaghan, was forced to recognize the title of khagan (Note: Bars Bek was recognized as the Khagan by the Göktürks, but he had not yet attained the rank of Khagan.) for the Kyrgyz ruler Bars Bek and even tried to create a dynastic alliance with him by marrying his "younger sister-princess" to him. However, this only temporarily dulled the most acute contradictions between the Göktürks and the Kyrgyz, who fought for dominance over Central Asia. In 707 and 709 Kyrgyz envoys visited the Tang Empire twice. At this time, the Göktürks were at war with the Tang Empire and the Kyrgyz found themselves in a new coalition with the Türgesh, Chik, Az and Tang Empire. The greatest danger to the Göktürks during this period was represented by the Kyrgyz who gained strength. In 709, the Göktürk army defeated the Chiks and Azs, capturing Tuva and a bridgehead for the invasion of the Kyrgyz lands. Bars Bek did not dare to intervene, hoping for the impregnability of their lands beyond the Sayan Mountains. However, in the winter of 710–711. the Göktürk army, having made a roundabout maneuver, crossed the Sayan Range and suddenly fell upon the Kyrgyz. As a result of the defeat in Battle of Sayan Mountains, the Kyrgyz army was defeated, and Bars Bek died. The Kyrgyz state was conquered, Göktürk troops were stationed in the Minusinsk Hollow. However, management was handed over to the Kyrgyz ruler. A Kyrgyz embassy arrived in China in 711. Perhaps it was sent by Bars Bek before his death in the hope of help. In 722 and 723 two Kyrgyz embassies arrived in Tang China, headed by tegin Isibo Sheyuzhe Bishi Sygin and Tegin Juili Pinhezhong Sigin.

=== Relations with Tang dynasty ===
The first embassy to Yenisei Kyrgyz was sent during reign of the Emperor Taizong of Tang, in 632. He received a Kyrgyz ambassador named Shiboqu Azhan (失鉢屈阿棧) who was later appointed to the Yanran (燕然) Commandery.

The Kyrgyz rulers claimed descent from the Han general Li Ling, grandson of the general Li Guang. Li Ling was captured by the Xiongnu and defected in the first century BCE. And since the Tang imperial Li family also claimed descent from Li Guang, the Kyrgyz khan was therefore recognized as a member of the Tang imperial family. This relationship soothed the relationship when Kyrgyz khagan Aču Khagan (阿熱) invaded the Uyghur Khaganate and put Qasar Khagan to death. The news brought to Chang'an by Kyrgyz ambassador Zhuwu Hesu (註吾合素).

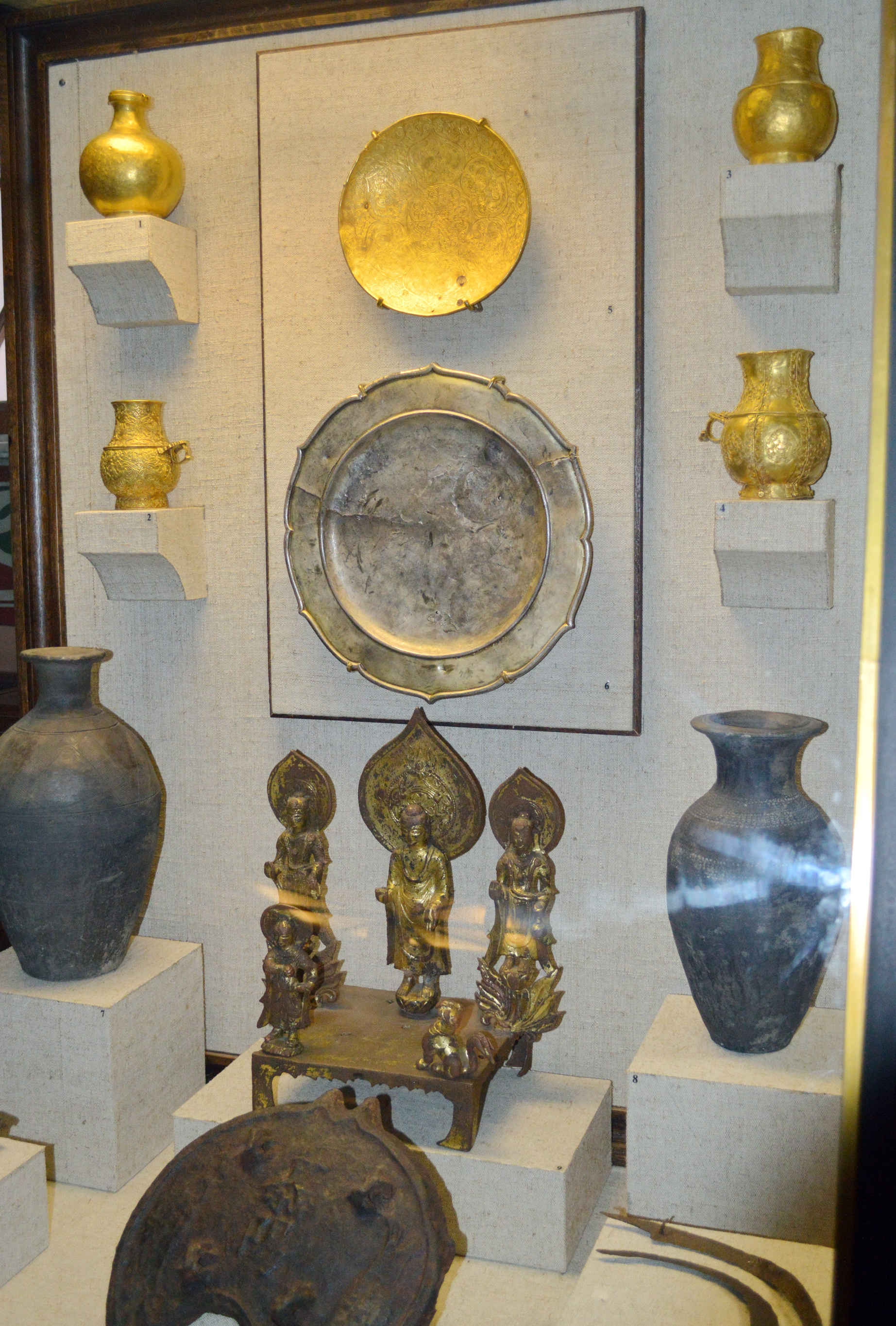
Yenisei Kyrgyz tableware and altar

The Khitan ruler Abaoji did extend his influence onto the Mongolian Plateau in 924, but there is no indication whatsoever of any conflict with the Kyrgyz. The only information we have from Khitan (Liao) sources regarding the Kyrgyz indicates that the two powers maintained diplomatic relations. Scholars who write of a Kyrgyz "empire" from about 840 to about 924 are describing a fantasy. All available evidence suggests that despite some brief extensions of their power onto the Mongolian Plateau, the Kyrgyz did not maintain a significant political or military presence there after their victories in the 840s.

— Michael Drompp

The Yenisei Kyrgyz Khaganate of the Are family bolstered his ties and alliance to the Tang imperial family against the Uyghur Khaganate by claiming descent from the Han dynasty general Li Ling who had defected to the Xiongnu and married a Xiongnu princess, daughter of Qiedihou Chanyu and was sent to govern the Jiankun (Ch'ien-K'un) region which later became Yenisei. Li Ling was a grandson of Li Guang (Li Kuang) of the Longxi Li family descended from Laozi which the Tang dynasty Li imperial family claimed descent from. The Yenisei Kyrgyz and Tang dynasty launched a successful war between 840 and 848 to destroy the Uyghur Khaganate and its centre at the Orkhon valley using their claimed familial ties as justification for an alliance. Tang forces under General Shi Xiong wounded the Uyghur khagan Ögä, seized livestock, took 5,000–20,000 Uyghur Khaganate soldiers captive, killed 10,000 Uyghur Khaganate soldiers on 13 February 843 at the Battle of Shahu (kill the barbarians) mountain.

In 845, Aču Khagan was made Zong Yingxiong Wu Chengming Khagan (Chinese: 宗英雄武誠明可汗; lit. 'Fathering Heroes', 'Martial and Sincere', 'Khagan of Light') by Emperor Wuzong. But Wuzong died before his ambassadors departed Chang'an. The new emperor Xuanzong did not rush to make him khagan. At a general council of senior officials, they decided that the titles were given to the Uyghurs when they were strong, and if the Yenisei Kyrgyz were awarded as well, they would become proud and become dangerous. The emperor revoked the letter.

After Aču's murder by one of his officials in 847, new Kyrgyz khagan was made Ïnǧu Khagan (英武誠明可汗) by Xuanzong, who sent Li Ye (李業) to award him the title.

After the tenth century, there is little additional information regarding the Kyrgyz until their absorption into the Mongol Empire in the thirteenth century. There was a conflict between the Kyrgyz and the Qara Khitai around 1130; the Kyrgyz were not defeated, but there is some speculation that at some point they came under the sway of the Qara Khitai. Almost 80 years later, in 1207/1208, the Kyrgyz submitted to the rising power of the Mongols under Genghis Khan.

— Michael Drompp

=== Religion ===
The religion of the population of the Kyrgyz Khaganate has been studied by various historians since the 19th century. Chinese and Arabic-Persian sources contain various information about the religion of the Yenisei Kyrgyz. Thus, the Chinese chronicles preserved data on the religious rituals of the Yenisei Kyrgyz:

A sacrifice is made to the spirits in the field. There is no fixed time for sacrifice. Shamans are called gan [kam]. At funerals, they wrap the body of the deceased in three rows and cry, and then burn it, and the collected bones are buried a year later. After that, crying is produced at certain times.

The Persian historian Gardizi in the 11th century wrote the following about the Yenisei Kyrgyz:

Some Kyrgyz worship the cow, others the wind, others the hedgehog, others the magpie, others the falcon, and others the mahogany trees. They have a special measured speech that they use in prayer. When they pray, they turn towards the south. They worship Saturn and Venus, and Mars is considered a bad omen. They have a prayer house.… Lamps (lit) they don't go out until they go out by themselves.

Similar information is given in the "Dictionary of Countries" by Yaqut al-Hamawi, which was published at the beginning of the 13th century:

They have a temple for worship, and they have reed pens with which to write. They do not extinguish their lamps until the combustible substance in them goes out by itself. They know the poetic speech that they utter during their prayer. They have several holidays a year. They pray facing south, worship Saturn and Venus, and consider Mars a bad omen. They have stones that glow at night, thanks to which they do not need lamps and which are used only in their country.

According to Gardizi and al-Marwazi, there was a position of "faginun" in the Kyrgyz Khaganate, who performed the duties of religious ministers. During the rituals, which were accompanied by music, the faginuns brought themselves to unconsciousness, and after waking up, predicted various events such as natural disasters or invasions of enemies. The burial cycle of the Yenisei Kyrgyz has been archaeologically studied quite well in various regions of Southern Siberia and Central Asia. The funeral ceremony took a long period of time — at least one year. The cycle consisted of several stages: choosing a place for the burial of the deceased, transporting the body of the deceased, preparing a funeral pyre, and so on. As the Kyrgyz Khaganate rose, other beliefs began to enter the state. Thus, as Manichaeism spread, some Kyrgyz khagans began to use the title "Khagan of Light" in relation to themselves, and monumental Manichaean temples began to be built in the state (the aforementioned Gardizi and Yakut al-Hamawi write about them) and Manichaean monasteries. Nestorian missionaries also actively served on the territory of the Khaganate. Nestorianism became widespread among the Kyrgyz aristocracy during the Kyrgyz expansion. Objects similar to the doors of the Christian panagia were found at the Kyrgyz burial ground of the 13th—14th centuries "Koibaly-I" from the Minusinsk Hollow. In turn, some Yenisei Kyrgyz who lived in East Turkestan, under the influence of Islam, switched from cremation rituals to traditional funerals.

The Kyrgyz Khaganate pursued a tolerant policy towards all religions of the state. The statesmen of the Kyrgyz Khaganate took into account the interests of adherents of all religions who lived in their territory. The religious elite of the state included the khagan, who had a sacred status, his dynasty and entourage, missionaries and traditional religious servants — shamans who participated in the most important religious events.

== Rulers ==
According to the Tobchiyan and Jami' al-tawarikh, title of the Yenisei Kyrgyz khagan was Īnāl (Persian: اینال, Chinese: 亦纳勒, yìnàlēi).

Title name in Old Turkic	Title name in Chinese (with pīnyīn romanization for Mandarin)	Reign	Religion	Dynasty
Bars Bek Khan (𐰉𐰺𐰽:𐰋𐰏:𐰴𐰣); Inanch Alp Bilge (𐰃𐰣𐰀𐰣𐰲𐰆:𐰀𐰞𐰯:𐰋𐰄𐰠𐰏𐰅)	巴爾斯別克 (bā'ěr sī biékè) 亦難赤阿爾普毗伽 (yìnánchì ā'ěrpǔ píjiā)	693–711	Tengrism	Are dynasty
Unknown khan(s)		711–c. 720	Tengrism	Are dynasty
Qutluğ Bilgä Khagan		c. 720-?	Tengrism	Are dynasty
Unknown khan(s)		?–758	Tengrism	Are dynasty
Bilgä Toŋ Erkin (𐰋𐰄𐰠𐰏𐰅:𐱄𐰆𐰣𐰏:𐰅𐰼𐰚𐰄𐰤)	毗伽頓頡斤 (píjiā dùnxié jīn)	758–795	Tengrism	Are dynasty
Aču Khagan (𐰀𐰳𐰆:𐰴𐰍𐰣)	宗英雄武誠明可汗 (zōng yīngxióng wǔ chéngmíng kèhán) 阿熱 (ārè)	795–847	Manichaeism	Are dynasty
Ïnǧu Khagan (𐰄𐰤𐰍𐰆:𐰴𐰍𐰣)	英武誠明可汗 (yīngwǔ chéngmíng kèhán)	847–866	Manichaeism	Are dynasty
Unknown khagan(s)		866–c. 925	Manichaeism	Are dynasty
Unknown khan(s)		c. 925–1207	Tengrism?	Unknown
