= Bars Bek =

Bars Bek 𐰉𐰺𐰽:𐰋𐰏
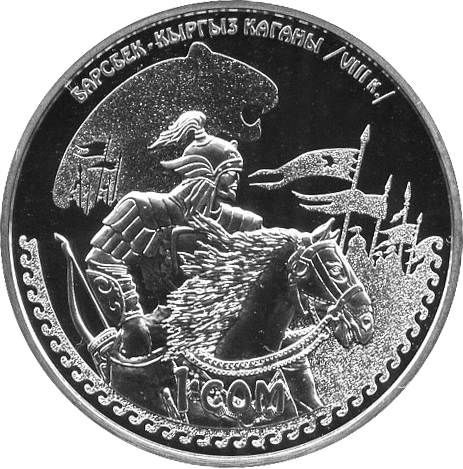
- The commemorative coin issued by the National Bank of Kyrgyzstan in 2010 in honor of Barsbek

Khagan of the Kyrgyz Khaganate
- Reign: 693–711
- Successor: unknown
- Born: 637
- Died: 711; Son River (modern-day Khakassia)
- Spouse: A sister of Bilge Khagan
- House: Are
- Religion: Tengriism

Bars Bek (Old Turkic: 𐰉𐰺𐰽:𐰋𐰏; Chinese: 巴爾斯別克; 637–711), also known as Inanch Alp Bilge (Chinese: 亦難赤阿爾普毗伽), was the first khan of the Kyrgyz Khaganate.

== Reign ==
Nothing is known about Bars Bek's early reign, except minor information fragments found in the Orkhon and Yenisei inscriptions. The royal Are clan, which Bars Bek was a member of, claimed descent from the Han dynasty general Li Ling.

During his reign, he was believed to be hostile to the Göktürks until he married with one of the daughters of Ilterish Qaghan and was appointed as a lesser khagan (khan) ruling over Az and Kyrgyz tribes.

In the late 7th century, according to Takeshi Osawa, Bars Bek mediated talks between Suoge and the Emperor Zhongzong of Tang. According to Klyashtorny, he sent an ambassador named Eren Ulug to the Tibetan Empire in an attempt to form an alliance but was unsuccessful.

== Title ==
According to Sergei Klyashtorny, Bars Bek's anointed name was Inanch Alp Bilge and was mentioned as such in Yenisei inscriptions. Turkish historian Saadeddin Gömeç argued against this.

== Death ==
After news of the triple alliance reached Tonyukuk, he decided to eliminate the Kyrgyz first. Roads to Kyrgyz lands were blocked by heavy snow, forcing them to find a guide. They first crossed Ak Termel (modern Ona - a tributary of the Abakan). However, after ten nights of searching for a way out, their guide became lost and was executed on the orders of Qapaghan. After a few days, they arrived at Kyrgyz headquarters and launched a night attack on Bars Bek, killing him. A memorial stele was erected after his death, on the left side of the Abakan river.

He was succeeded by his son and Bilge Qaghan's nephew.

== Legacy ==
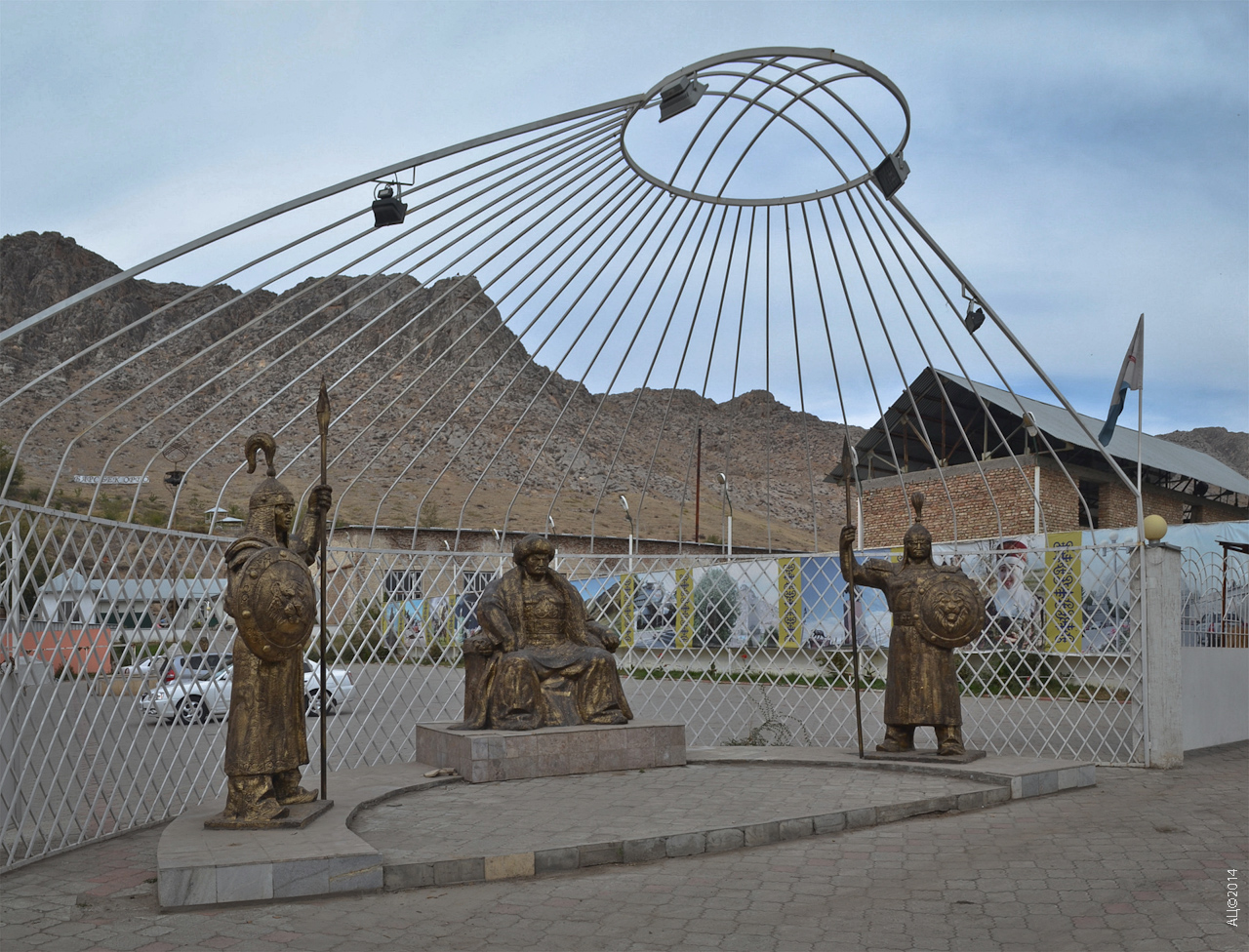
Statue of Bars Bek in Osh

A commemorative coin honouring Bars Bek was issued by the National Bank of the Kyrgyz Republic in 2010. In 2017, a monument to Bars Bek was erected in Osh.
