= Uyuk Turan Inscription =

A Yenisei Inscription monument in Tuva

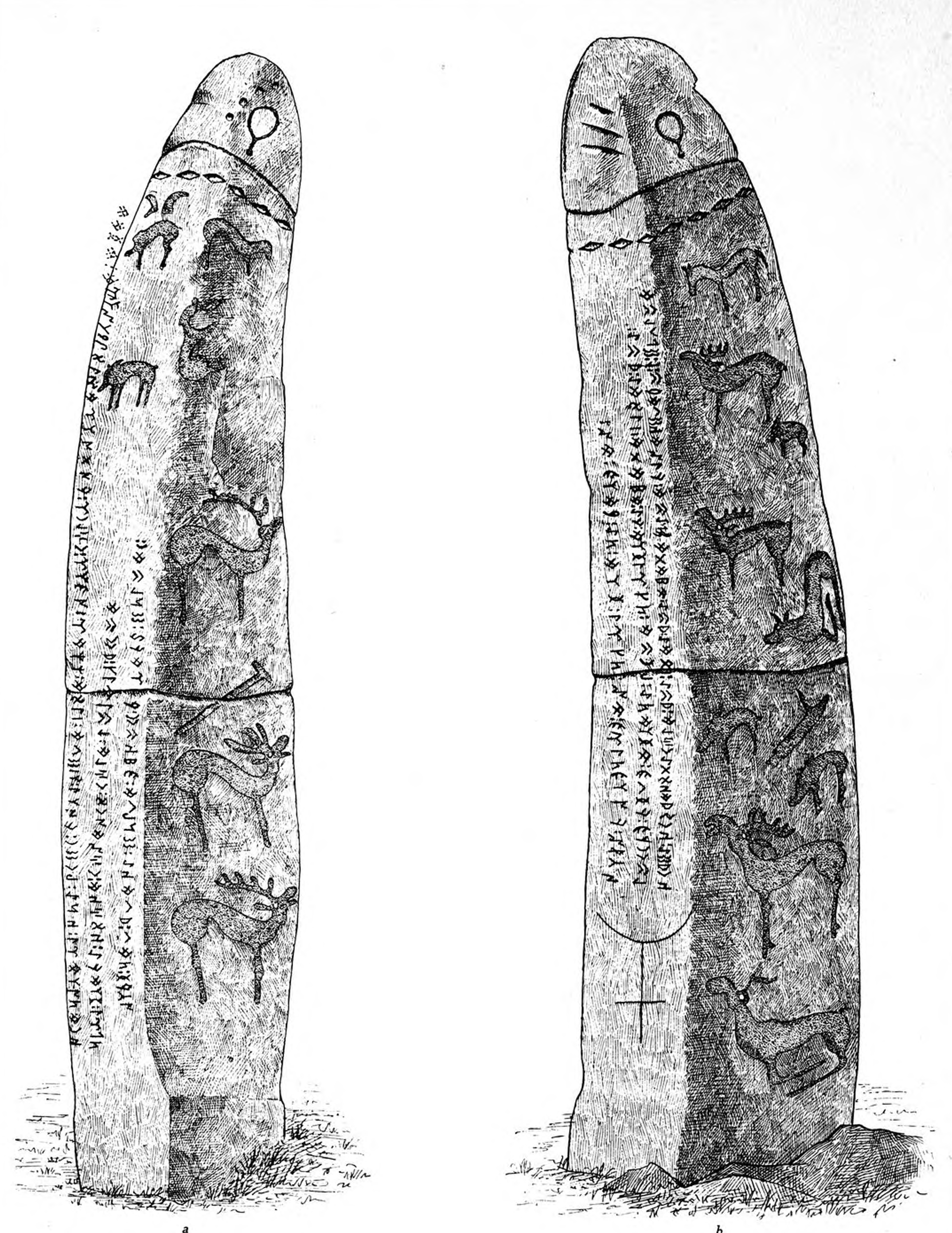
- Deer stone stele, erected circa 1000 BCE, on which was added the Uyuk Turan Inscription in the 8th-9th centuries CE.
- Height: 277 cm
- Width: 38 cm
- Depth: 27 cm
- Writing: Old Turkic
- Language: Yenisei Kyrgyz
- Culture: Yenisei Kyrgyz

The Uyuk-Turan Inscription is an inscription estimated to be dated to the 8th-9th centuries, possibly created during the Yenisei Kyrgyz Khaganate. It was discovered in the steppes near the Uyuk-Turan river valley, around the city of Turan in the Republic of Tuva. The inscription, which is recognized as a part of a larger group of inscriptions known as the Yenisei Inscriptions, is written in the Orkhon Turkic language using the Old Turkic runic script. Yenisei inscriptions are type of monument stones erected for deceased statesmen. The tradition of erecting monument stones in memory of the deceased was commonly observed among the Göktürks. However, archaeologist Ivor Kormushin suggests that after the Göktürk Khaganate, the tradition of erecting monument stones for important statesmen continued among the Uyghurs, which is why the Uyuk-Turan Inscription is believed to have been written after the Orkhon Inscriptions which is also written in Old Turkic. The monument itself is a Deer stone, erected circa 1000 BCE, and the textual inscription was made secondarily in the 8th-9th century CE.

== Characteristics ==
The inscription is made of chocolate-colored limestone and is located on the right bank of the Turan river, which is one of the rivers flowing into the Uyuk river. The stone has 8 tiers and is 5 "pus" (a historical measurement unit) in height, 1 pus in width, and 11 pus in thickness. The inscriptions are on both sides of the stone. The northern face features an image of an animal. There are also seals on the southern part of the inscription.

== Content ==
=== Transcription of Front Side ===
1. quyda qunǰuyïm özdä oɣlïm ayït a äsizim a ayït a bökmädim adrïltïm äkinim qadašïm ayït a adrïltïm
2. altunlïɣ kešig belimtä bantïm täŋri elimkä bökmädim äsizim a ayït a
3. üčin külig tirig bän täŋri elimtä yämlig bän

=== Transcription of Back Side ===
1. üč yetmiš yašïmqa adrïltïm ägük qatun yärimkä adrïltïm
2. täŋri elimkä qïzɣaqïm oɣlïm ... oɣlïm altï biŋ yuntïm
3. qanïm tölböri qara bodun külig qadašïm äsizim a ič äčim är öglär oɣlan är küdägülärim qïz kälinlärim bökmädim
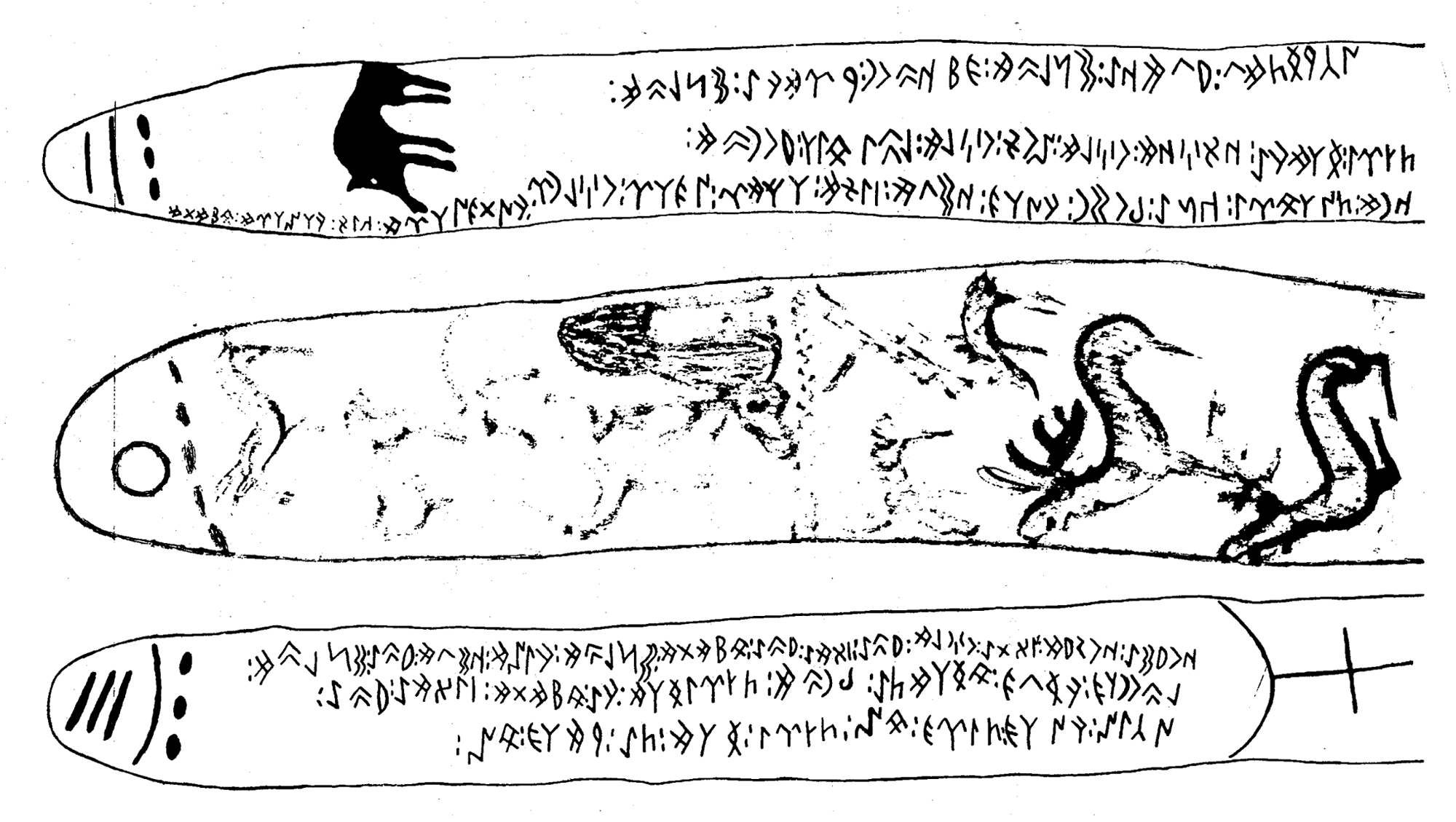
  Drawings and Tamga in the Uyuk Turan Stele.

=== Translation of Front Side ===
1. My consort in the secluded, my son in the steppe says: pity me, they say: I did not satisfied, I separated. My uncles, my brotheren says: I separated.
2. I tied the golden quiver to my waist, my holy land: I did not satisfied, pity me,(they) say.
3. Üčin Külig Tirig I am. I... in my holy land.

=== Translation of Back Side ===
1. At my age of sixty three, i separated. Ägük Khatun, I separated from my place.
2. My holy land, my daughter, my son...my son, my six thousand horses.
3. My khan Tölböri, my people, Külig my brother, pity me, ... son, my sons-in-law, daughter, my daughters-in-law. I did not satisfied.
