= Battle of Sayan Mountains =

8th c. military engagement

Date	710 or 711
Location	Modern Russia
Result	Göktürk victory

Belligerents
Second Turkic Khaganate	Kyrgyz Khaganate

Commanders and leaders
Tonyukuk; Kul Tigin; Bilge Qaghan	Bars Bek Khagan †; Teksin-Inal †; Kuli-Chor †; Ezrege-Ichregi †

Strength
50,000	80,000

Casualties and losses
Minimal	Heavy

The Battle of Sayan Mountains was a major battle between the Göktürks and Kyrgyz Khaganate followed by a successful battle led by Tonyukuk.

== Battle ==
When Kul Tigin was 26 years old, in the winter of 710 or 711, the Göktürk army set out for the Kyrgyz campaign. Kul Tigin and Bilge Qaghan also joined this expedition, the army was led by Tonyukuk. The Göktürk army which overcame the snow-covered Kögmen yiş on foot, through Ak Termil where only one person could pass at a time, by rolling down. They overcame obstacle on the mountain in ten days and went down the Ani Suyu. They arrived for a night attack on the Kyrgyz. According to Gumiliev, the reason why Tonyukuk, Kul Tigin and Bilge Qaghan made a night attack was that the Kyrgyz had a well-armed, 80,000 strong army and had enough hay for their horses. In the battle, Kul Tigin mounted the white stallion of Bayirku, whom they had beaten before, and attacked, killing many soldiers. During these attack, the Kyrgyz attacked Kul Tigin's horse by "breaking his thigh they shot". At the end of the battle, the Kyrgyz were defeated and the Kyrgyz Khagan was killed, "the province was taken" and the Göktürks returned to Ötüken.
