= Uyuk-Tarlak inscription =

Turkic inscription

Uyuk-Tarlak II is an inscription erected by Yenisei Kyrgyz. It was found by Aspelin in 1888 on a slope two kilometres away from the river Tarlak, Tuva. The stone was transported to the Minusinsk Museum of Regional History in 1916 and catalogued under the number 20. It measures 183 x 33 centimetres.

== Translation ==
=== Transliteration ===
sIz : elmA : KWnǰWymA : WGLNmA : ḄWḌNmA : sIz : mA : LṬmŝ : Yŝm : DA
Ṭm : elṬWGN : ṬWṬwK : bn : tŋrI : elm : kA : elčIsI : rtm : LṬI : BGBWḌN : KA : bgI : rtm

Old Turkic original text:

atïm el toγan totoq bän täŋri älimkä älčisi (Note: Erdal (2002: 60) is of opinion that the word elči is better to understand as 'ruler'.) ärtim altï baγ bodunqa bägi ärtim
äsiz (Note: Tekin (1964) was the first who has pointed out that the runiform letters <sIz> are to be read as äsiz 'alas'.) elim a qunǰuyïm a oγlanïm a bodunïm a äsizim a altmïš yašïmda

English translation:

My name was El Togan Totok. I was the ambassador for my heavenly realm. I was the ruler of the six alliances.
O sorrow! O my realm, o my consort, o my son, o my people! O my sorrow! I was in the age of sixty.

Translation by Turk Bitig
Old Turkic original text:

Аtïm : El Tuγun : Tutuq : ben : Teŋiri : Elim : ke : еlčisi : ertim : altï : baγ : budun : qa : (beg : ertim : )
еsiz (Note: Esiz. This word is occurred frequently in Yenisey inscriptions. The scientists below considered this word the following way: W.Radloff siz - «Von euch», S.Malov siz - «from You», I.A. Baranov- «from You». In this case it’s necessary to clarify the meaning of this word. There are two suggestions of this question: posthumous words where devoted to someone who died, or these inscriptions were death words of a dying man. In any case, the stone words were written from died man. Words devoted to the deceased person occurred rarely. In other words this word is edification of the deceased person. For this reason, the word «You» and «alas, grief» wouldn’t suit for translation.) : Elime : qunčuyïma : oγulïma : budunïma : esiz : іme : altmïš : yašïmda :

English translation:

My name is El-Tuγun Tutuq. I was the ambassador of my Tengri country. I was lord of six destiny people
of my owner-less country, wife, sons and people, left without master in my sixty years.
