= Orkhon Turkic =

Extinct Turkic language spoken by the Göktürks

- Göktürk
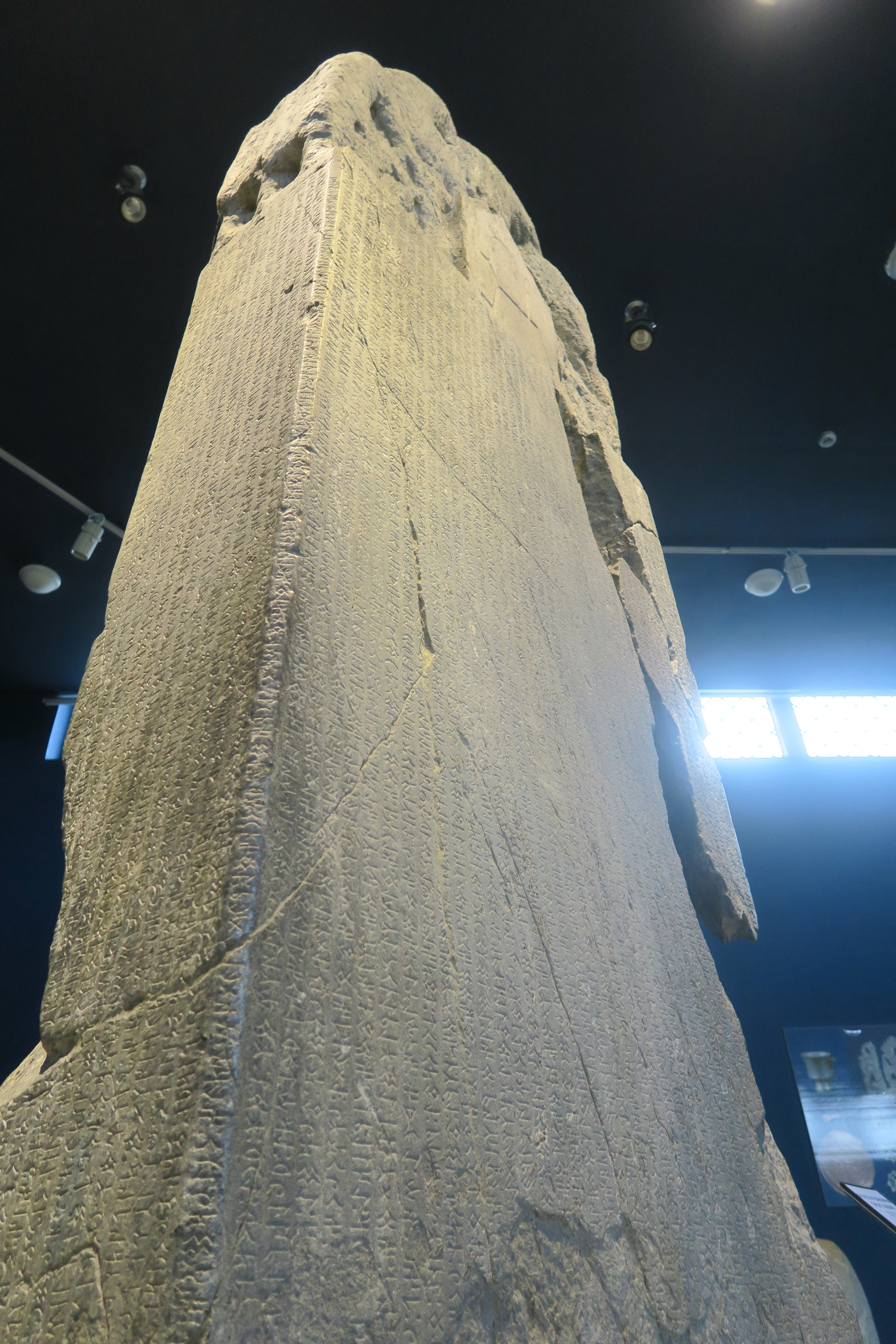
- Kul Tigin stele, of the Orkhon inscription
- Region: Eastern Europe, Central Asia, Eastern Asia
- Ethnicity: Göktürks, Yenisei Kyrgyz
- Era: 5th–8th century
- Language family: Turkic: Common Turkic; Siberian Turkic; Southern Siberian; Old Turkic; Orkhon Turkic
- Dialects: Orkhon; Yenisei Kyrgyz
- Writing system: Old Turkic

Language codes
- ISO 639-3: otk
- Glottolog: orkh1234

Orkhon Turkic (also Göktürk) is the earliest version of Old Turkic, known as the oldest Turkic literary language, preceding Old Uyghur. It is the language in which the Orkhon and Yenisei inscriptions are written.

== Dialects ==
Turkic people used a common literary language in the 5th-8th centuries, but there were some differences. It is possible to examine the Orkhon Turkic under two Yenisei and the Classical Orkhon Turkic headings. Orkhon Turkic had two main dialects, both written in Orkhon script.

=== Orkhon Turkic Inscriptions ===
The language used in the inscriptions, most of which are found along the Orkhon river is called the Orkhon Turkic language. It contains not only tombstones but also diaries describing state events. For this reason, it is richer in terms of language and the language used expertly.

=== Yenisei Kyrgyz Inscriptions ===
The language used in the inscriptions found along the Yenisei river is called the Yenisei Kyrgyz dialect.

==== Phonetics ====
In Yenisei inscriptions, the letters e and i change places from time to time. The same change is seen in b with m, g with k, ş with s, and z with s. It has also been seen once in the letters ı and i.

==== Morphonology ====
A completely morphological difference was not detected in the Yenisei Inscriptions. But there are some points:

- In Orkhon inscriptions, the case of direction takes the suffix -a/-e after the possessive suffix, while in the Yenisei inscriptions it sometimes takes the suffixes -qa/-ke/-ğa/-ge when the same is the case.
- In the locative case, the letters l and n sometimes have the suffix -te/-ta but sometimes the suffix -de/-da.
- The past tense begins irregularly, sometimes with a hard consonant and sometimes with a soft consonant.

=== Other inscriptions ===
==== Talas Inscriptions ====
They are found around Talas, Issyk-Kul and Kochkor. They were written with the Yenisei variants of the Orkhon alphabet. It is believed that these inscriptions were also written by the Kyrgyzs.

The language of the texts used in the inscriptions is the same as the language used in the Orkhon and Yenisei inscriptions. The suffix -ka after the possessive suffix, which is seen in some of the Yenisei Kyrgyz inscriptions, is not seen in these inscriptions.

== Phonology ==
Orkhon Turkic is a Shaz Turkic language, and a d-type Turkic language (e.g.; Turkish: ayak, Chuvash: ура (ura) but Old Turkic: 𐰑𐰴 (adaq), 'leg) which belongs to the Siberian Turkic branch.

=== Consonants ===
Orkhon Turkic consonants
		Labial	Dental/Alveolar	Palatal	Velar
Nasal		m	n	ɲ	ŋ
Stop	voiceless	p	t		k q
Stop	voiced	b	d		g
Fricative	voiceless		s ʃ		
Fricative	voiced		z		ɣ
Affricate	voiceless		t͡ʃ		
Affricate	voiced				
Approximant			l	j	
Rhotic			r		

[p] occurs in all positions in a word, but word-initial occurrences are all loanwords.

=== Vowels ===
It sometimes has long vowels.

== Vocabulary ==
Most of the vocabulary includes words of Turkic origin in Orkhon Turkic. In addition, a few words used are based on languages such as Sogdian and Middle Chinese. Mehmet Ölmez claims that about 20% of the vocabulary in Orkhon Turkic comes from neighboring cultures.

The borrowed words of the Orkhon Turkic period include Chinese, Sogdian, Mongolian, and Tibetan loanwords. Orkhon Turkic has a vocabulary that is less influenced by Sogdian and more heavily influenced by Chinese. In the period of Old Uyghur, Sogdian loanwords increase exponentially. The main reason for the increase of Sogdian influence is that the Uyghurs embraced Manichaeism.
