= Az people =

Extinct Turkic people

The Az or As were a Turkic people from the Eastern and Southern Altai and are associated with the Türkic period Kudyrge culture in the Altai.

== Mentions ==
The Az people's existence is confirmed by the Tannu-Ola mountains inscriptions of Mugur-Sargol and Bayan-Kol and certain verses of the Göktürks, while describing the battles between the Göktürks and the Kyrgyz. According to the Bayan-Kol inscriptions, the Az were divided to many clans living in the region of Mugur west of the Tannu-Ola mountains. There are also writings from the 8th century (around 714 AD) in Uyghur sources about the uprising of the Az against the Göktürks.

== Origins ==
The Az left the runic Kalbak-Tash II inscription which was written in a Turkic language. According to L.P. Potapov, the names of the Telengit seoks (Tёrtas – “four As”, Djeti-as – “seven As”, Baylangas – “numerous As”) suggest that the As tribe was a part of the Turkic Tiele.

However, many researchers (e.g. Golden, Kyzlasov, etc.) dispute the Az's Turkic origin and propose that the Az had been a people of non-Turkic origin who were influenced by neighboring Turkic people and became Turkophones: Russian linguist experts, who research the Az people, trace them as close ethnically to Ket people of Yenisei basin in Siberia due to similarities in name between 𐰔:𐰉𐰆𐰑𐰣 az budïn and the Assans, who spoke an extinct Yeniseic Kott dialect. The primary information on their language was collected by Matthias Castrén in 1845, with further research and information added later by the anthropologist Dmitry Anuchin. Meanwhile, Az were also hypothesized to be Turkicized descendants of the Iranian-speakers, particularly Asiani-Wusun. Kubarev (2016) proposes the Az's inscription proves either that the Az were Turkic speakers, or they used the Turkic language only for writing, not for speaking, (Note: If true, this would parallel the fact that the Siberian-Turkic-speaking Göktürks left early official inscriptions in only Sogdian and Rouran languages before the invention of the Old Turkic script.) or that they were adapting Turkic culture.

== Legacy ==
The name Az has been suggested to live on in the names of several other peoples of southern Siberia: the Kamas ("Mountain Az"), the Karagas ("Black Az" or "Plains Az"), and the Khakas ("White Az"). However, Khakas is in fact an exonym constructed by the Soviets for Yenisei Kyrgyz' descendants, based on Mandarin Chinese 黠戛斯; Xiajiasi, whose Middle Chinese ancestor *ɦˠɛt̚-kˠɛt̚-siᴇ (in ZS's reconstruction) actually transcribed the ancient endonym Kyrgyz.

Similar names of genealogical nature are ascertainable among modern and historical Turkic tribes: Old Bulgars, Nogais, Altaians, Turkmens, Uzbeks, Kazan Tatars and Kazakhs.

According Potapov, the Az is certainly connected with the modern-day Altai population.

A wide toponymic distribution of the name As, Az and Ash is found in Turkey, Azerbaijan, Central Asia and Altai region.

== Sources ==
Saadettin Gömeç: İslâm Öncesi Türk Tarihinin Kaynakları Üzerine. In: AÜ Dil ve Tarih-Coğrafya Fakültesi Tarih Bölümü Tarih Araştırmaları Dergisi, Bd. 20, Nr. 31, 2000, S. 51–92 (72f.)
