= Are (surname) =

Are (Chinese: 阿熱; pinyin: Ārè), also rendered as Aro and Aje, is a Chinese surname with origins in the Western Regions. The Biographies of the Huigu from the New Book of Tang stated:

The Xiajiasi claimed to be descendants of Li Ling......The Xiajiasi are what were in ancient times the Kingdom of Jiankun [(堅昆)]......As their ruler was known as Are, they took the surname of Are.

The ruling house of the Yenisei Kyrgyz Khaganate bore the surname Are. Yenisei Kyrgyz khagans claimed descent from the Han dynasty general Li Ling.
