= Yenisei Inscriptions =

Ancient Turkic inscriptions in Russia

The Yenisei Inscriptions are a series of Old Turkic inscriptions from the 8th-10th century CE, found near Yenisei Kyrgyz kurgans located in the Upper and Middle basins of the Yenisei River in modern-day Russia in Khakassia, Tuva and the Altai Republic.

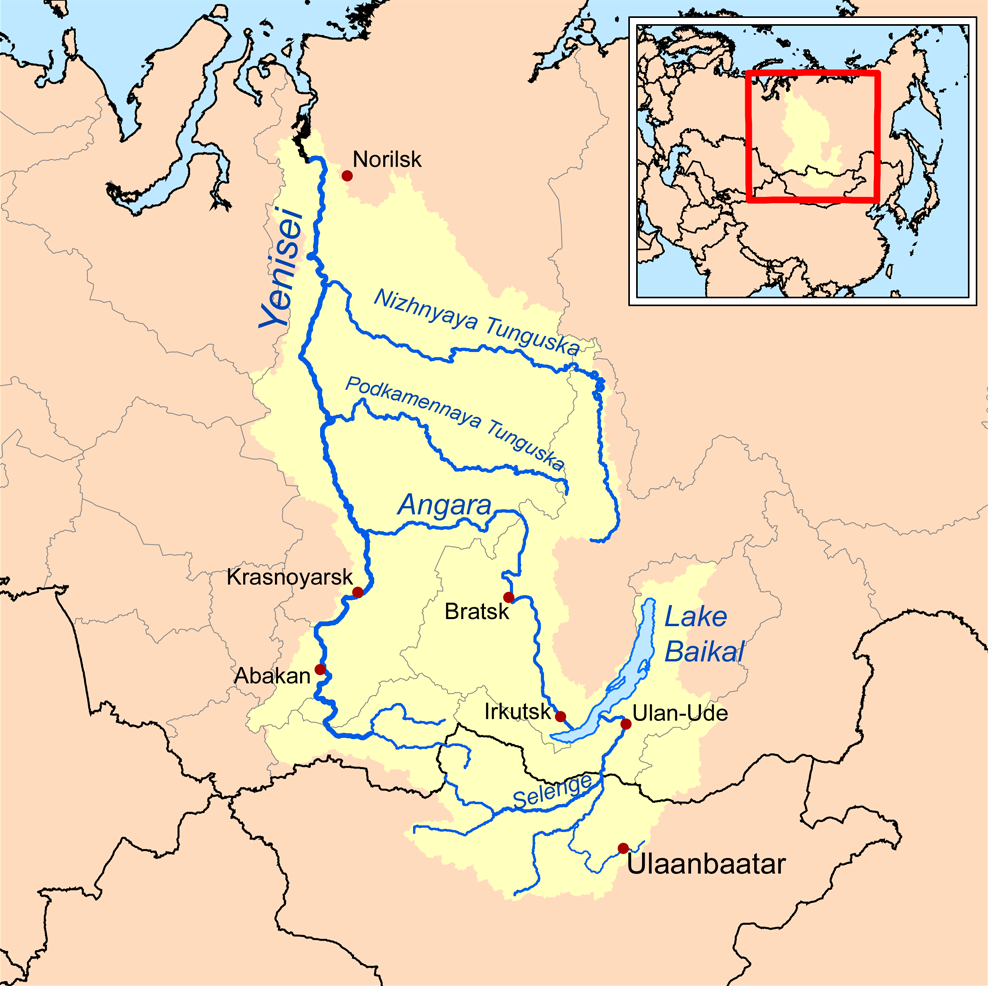
Yenisei Basin

It is believed that Yenisei Inscriptions belong to different Turkic tribes living in Yenisei region. Some of these inscriptions, which are usually erected as tombstones, are a few words, most of them 5-10 lines. These inscriptions are written in plain and no exaggeration language. It is often seen that the author tells in a sincere language that they left this world without being satiated. Traces of Shamanism is also seen in the inscriptions.

== Period ==
Yenisei inscriptions used unique letters instead of some of the Orkhon letters that we see in Orkhon inscriptions. These are more primitive than the letters used in Orkhon inscriptions. The texts used in the inscriptions are also primitive compared to the Orkhon inscriptions and there are no long texts since all are tombstones. Therefore, it is thought to have been written before the Orkhon inscriptions. However, dating studies point to the 8th-9th centuries.

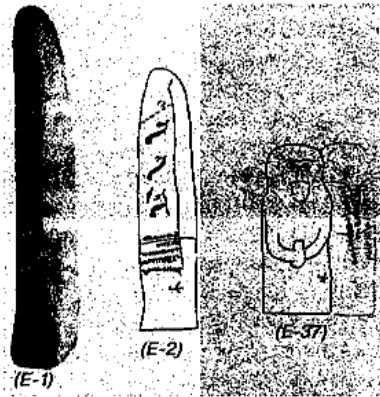
Yenisei written monuments: E-1 monument Uyuk-Tarlak, E-2 monument Uyuk-Arzhan, E-37 monument Tes

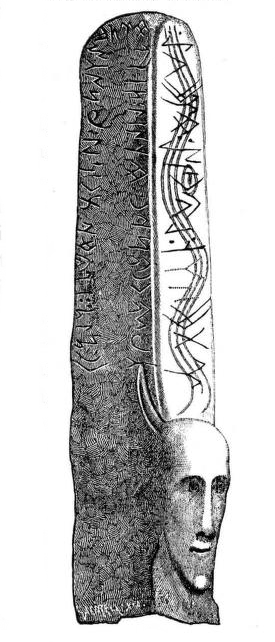
Stele Uybat-I. The stele itself dates back to the Okunev culture, 2nd millennium BCE.

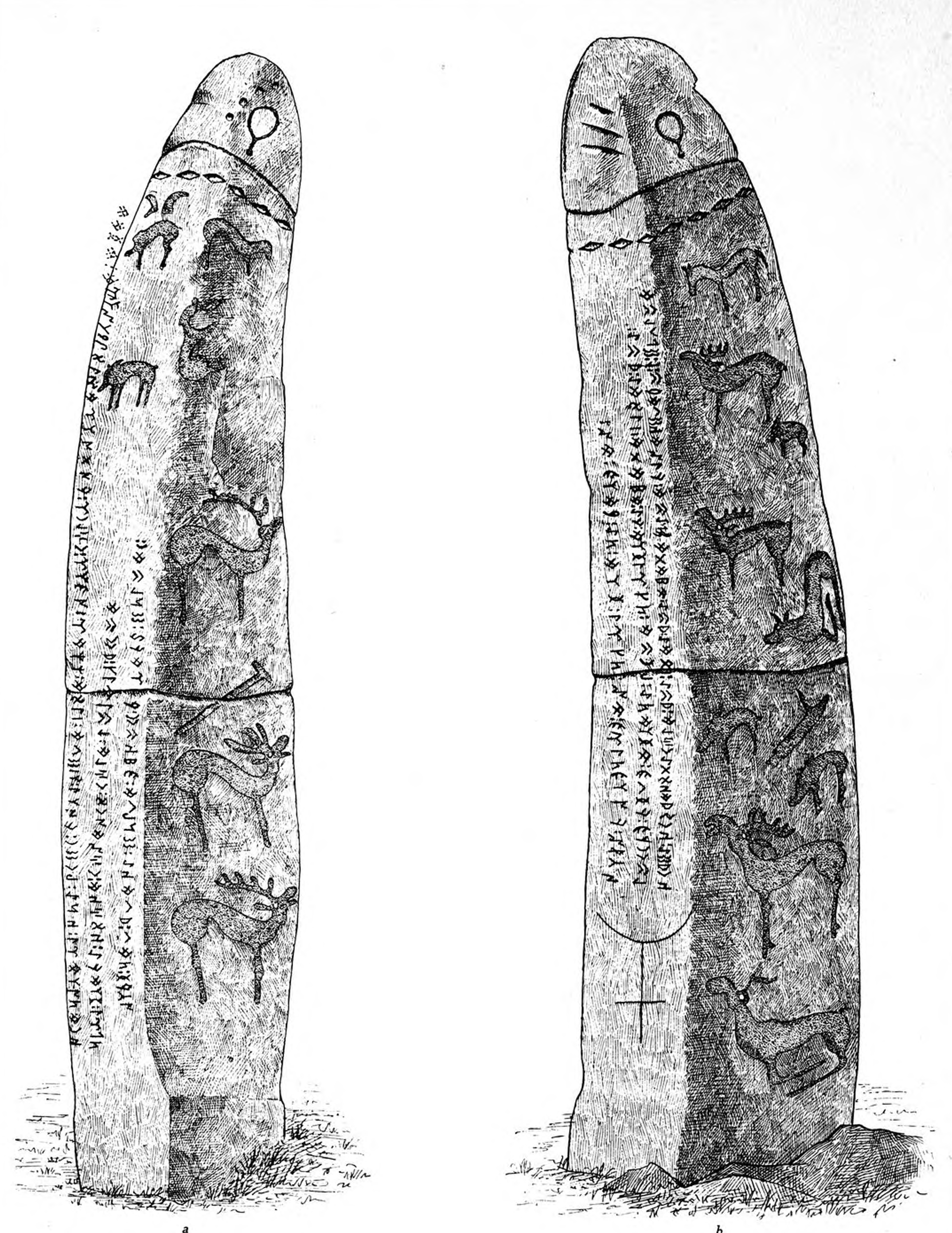
Re-used Deer stone stele (circa 1000 BCE), with Uyuk Turan Inscription.

== History of investigation ==
By 1983, 145 inscriptions were known, by 2006 - 184 inscriptions, and as of 2013, 225 inscriptions have been found.

== Inscriptions of Yenisei tribes ==
The inscriptions were named with the name of the river, village or region where they were first found, and were indicated with numbers such as E-1, E-50, e-150 in academic type. For example: Uyuk-Tarlak (Е-1), Barık I (Е-5), Barık II (Е-6), Elegest (Е-10), Begre (Е-11), Uybat I (Е-30) etc.

=== List of Inscriptions ===
Sources:

- E1 （ Uyuk-Tarlak ）
- E2 （ Uyuk-Arjan ）
- E3 （ Uyuk-Turan ）
- E4 （ Ottuk-Daş I ）
- E5 （ Barık I ）
- E6 （ Barık II ）
- E7 （ Barık III ）
- E8 （ Barık IV ）
- E9 （ Kara-sug ）
- E10 （ Elegest Yazıtı I ）
- E11 （ Begre ）
- E12 （ Aldı-Bel I ）
- E13 （ Çaa-höl I ）
- E14 （ Çaa-höl II ）
- E15 （ Çaa-höl III ）
- E16 （ Çaa-höl IV ）
- E17 （ Çaa-höl V ）
- E18 （ Çaa-höl VI ）
- E19 （ Çaa-höl VII ）
- E20 （ Çaa-höl VIII ）
- E21 （ Çaa-höl IX ）
- E22 （ Çaa-höl X ）
- E23 （ Çaa-höl XI ）
- E24 （ Inscriptions on Khaya-Uju rocks ）
- E25 （ Oznachennoe ）
- E28 （ Oçurı Аçurı ）
- E27 （ Oya ）
- E28 （ Altın-köl ）
- E29 （ Altın-Köl ）
- E30 （ Uybat I ）
- E31 （ Uybat II ）
- E32 （ Uybat III ）
- E33 （ Uybat-IV ）
- E34 （ Uybat-V ）
- E35 （ Tuba I ）
- E36 （ Tuba II ）
- E37 （ Tes ）
- E38 （ Ak-Yus ）
- E39 （ Kara-Yus ）
- E40 （ Taşeba ）
- E41 （ Kemçik-Çıgrak ）
- E42 （ Bay-bulun I ）
- E43 （ Kızıl-Çıraa I ）
- E44 （ Kızıl-Çıraa II ）
- E45 （ Kejeelig-Hovu ）
- E46 （ Tele ）
- E48 （ Abakan ）
- E49 （ Bay-bulun II ）
- E50 （ Tuva stele «B» inscriptions ）
- E51 （ Tıva III ）
- E52 （ Elegest II ）
- E53 （ Elegest III ）
- E54 （ Ottuk Daş III ）
- E55 （ Tuvian stele "G" ）
- E56 （ Malinovka ）
- E57 （ Suygyn ）
- E58 （ Kezek-Hure ）
- E59 （ Kerbis-baarı ）
- E60 （ Sargal Aqsy ）
- E61 （ Sulug-adır-aksı ）
- E62 （ Kanımıldık-kobı ）
- E63 （ Ortaa-Hem ）
- E64 （ Ottuk Daş II ）
- E65 （ Kara-bulun I ）
- E66 （ Kara-bulun II ）
- E67 （ Kara-bulun III ）
- E68 （ El-Bajı ）
- E69 （ Çer-Çarık ）
- E70 （ Elegest IV Eer Hol ）
- E71 （ Podkuninskoe ）
- E72 （ Aldı Bel II ）
- E73 （ Yime ）
- E74 （ Samagaltay ）
- E75 （ Küten-Buluk ）
- E76 （ Mirror I ）
- E77 （ Mirror II ）
- E78 （ Inscription on Chinese copper coin I ）
- E79 （ Inscription on Chinese copper coin II ）
- E80 （ Bronze Plaque ）
- E81 （ Golden Vessel I ）
- E82 （ Golden Vessel II ）
- E83 （ Uybat VII ）
- E84 （ Mirror III ）
- E85 （ Mirror IV ）
- E86 （ Amulet Signs ）
- E87 （ Text on a Spindle ）
- E88 （ Text on an Amulet ）
- E89 ( Övür-I ）
- E90 （ Övür-I ）
- E91 （ Bedelig ）
- E92 （ Demir-Sug ）
- E93 （ Yur-Sayur I ）
- E94 （ Yur-Sayur II ）
- E95 （ Xemçik-Bom I ）
- E96 （ Xemçik-Bom II ）
- E97 （ Xemçik-Bom III ）
- E98 （ Uybat VI ）
- E99 （ Ortaa-Tey ）
- E100 （ Bayan-Qol ）
- E102 （ Arjan II inscriptions ）
- E103 （ Arjan II inscriptions ）
- E104 （ Oznachennoe II ）
- E105 （ A Stele from Kyzyl Museum ）
- E108 （ Uyuk Oorzak I ）
- E109 （ Uyuk Oorzak II ）
- E110 （ Uyuk Oorzak III ）
- E111 （ Tepsey I ）
- E112 （ Tepsey II ）
- E113 （ Tepsey III ）
- E114 （ Tepsey IV ）
- E115 （ Tepsey V ）
- E116 （ Tepsey VI ）
- E117 （ Tepsey VII ）
- E118 （ Turan I ）
- E119 （ Saglı / Balbal Inscription in Saglı ）
- E120 （ Tugutüp I ）
- E121 （ Tugutüp II ）
- E122 （ İyme II ）
- E123 （ Tepsey VIII ）
- E124 （ Tepsey IX ）
- E125 （ Tepsey X ）
- E126 （ Tepsey XI ）
- E127 （ Mirror V / Zerkale iz Minusinska ）
- E128 （ Mirror VI ）
- E129 （ Mirror VII ）
- E130 （ Mirror VIII ）
- E131 （ Bronz Levha / Bronz Söve Pervazı ）
- E132 （ Uybat VIII / Uybat ÇaaTas Stone ）
- E133 （ Kopön Altın Küp III / Kopyon Çaa-Tas Stone ）
- E134 （ Ust-Sos ）
- E135 （ Ust-Kulog ）
- E136 （ Mugur-Sargol I ）
- E137 （ Kres-Haya ）
- E138 （ Kara-Yüs II / Ozernaya ）
- E139 （ Çaptıkov Taşı / Çaptık Taşı ）
- E140 （ Mugur-Sargol II ）
- E141 （ Bow sheath from Aymırlıg Kurgan I / the inscription on the horn bow I ）
- E142 （ Bow sheath from Aymırlıg Kurgan II / the inscription on the horn bow II ）
- E143 （ Mirror IX ）
- E144 （ Novosyolovo ）
- E145 （ Mugur-Sargol III ）
- E146 （ - ）
- E147 （ Yeerbek I ）
- E148 （ Mugur-Sargol II ）
- E149 （ Yeerbek II ）
- E150 （ - ）
- E151 （ - ）
- E152 （ Şançı 3 ）
- E153 （ Alash I ）
- E154 （ Alash II ）
- E155 （ Lisiç'ya I ）
- E164 （ Adrianov ）
