= Li Ling =

Chinese military general

- 李陵
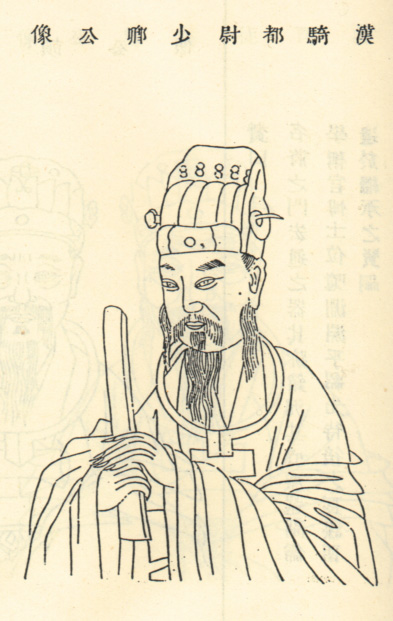
- Born: Chengji, Longxi, Han dynasty
- Died: 74 BC
- Father: Li Danghu
- Relatives: Li Guang (grandfather)
- Military career
- Allegiance: Han dynasty; Xiongnu
- Rank: Commandant of Cavalry (騎都尉)

Li Ling (Chinese: 李陵; pinyin: Lǐ Líng, died 74 BC), courtesy name Shaoqing (Chinese: 少卿; pinyin: Shǎoqīng), was a Chinese military general of the Western Han dynasty who served during the reign of Emperor Wu. He later defected to the Xiongnu after being defeated in an expedition in 99 BC.

== Early life ==
Li Ling was born in Chengji (成紀, in modern-day Tianshui) in the Longxi region. He was the grandson of the "Flying General" Li Guang. His father Li Danghu died before he was born, Li Danghu's younger brother Li Gan was shot by Huo Qubing. Li Gan was a ancestor of Li Gao, the founder of Western Liang during the Sixteen Kingdoms.

According to the Records of the Grand Historian and the Book of Han, Li Ling was skilled in mounted archery. Emperor Wu saw Li's future potential in the military and appointed Li, at a young age, as a high-profile imperial servant (侍中建章監), a position previously held by Wei Qing and Huo Qubing.

Li Ling was later assigned a military position on the border front, and once led 800 men over 1,000 miles into Xiongnu territory for a reconnaissance mission. Although he did not encounter any enemies, Emperor Wu soon promoted him to the role of cavalry commander, assigned him to lead 5,000 elite infantries, and placed him in charge of training local reserve forces in Jiuquan and Zhangye. A few years later, Li Ling began serving regular military roles, but was limited to escorting higher-level generals such as Li Guangli (Emperor Wu's brother-in-law, and brother of Lady Li and Li Yannian).

== Battle, defeat and defection ==
In 99 BC, Emperor Wu ordered Li Guangli to lead 30,000 men for an offensive from Jiuquan against the Xiongnu in the Tian Shan region. Li Ling was assigned to provide an escort for Li Guangli's supply line. Li Ling requested Emperor Wu's permission to lead his own regiment to the east, saying that he led a personal legion of "warriors from Jingchu and extraordinary swordsmen", who were capable of "strangling tigers and sharpshooting". Emperor Wu initially disapproved and warned Li Ling that there was no additional cavalry available to assign to him. Li Ling then bragged that he would crush the Chanyu's main tribe with nothing more than his 5,000 infantry. Impressed by Li Ling's enthusiasm, Emperor Wu assented.

A senior general Lu Bode was assigned to assist Li Ling. However, Lu did not like the idea of supporting Li in such a mission, and suggested that Emperor Wu delay the mission until spring as the fighting strength of the Xiongnu often peaked in autumn, whereafter they could attack with 5,000 men each from two columns. Emperor Wu was angry at Lu's request, believing that Li Ling had collaborated with Lu and had asked for a delay out of cowardice, and responded by ordering an immediate mobilization of Li's troops.

Li Ling's army marched north for 30 days, and sketched maps of the lands they travelled. A junior officer named Chen Bule (陳步樂) was sent back to report on the army's progress. Upon seeing Emperor Wu, Chen began boasting of the success of Li Ling and his men in fighting the enemy, which were likely false, as Li Ling's advance had been unresisted up to that point. Pleased with the good news, Emperor Wu promoted Chen as a reward.

Li Ling's troops encountered the main forces of the Chanyu upon arrival at the Altay Mountains, and were quickly encircled by 30,000 cavalry between two mountains. With no supply and reinforcement (Li thought there was no need), Li ordered his troops to use the wagons as cover and prepare for battle. With a large advantage in numbers, the Chanyu attacked Li Ling's forces front-on, only to suffer heavy casualties under the Han troops' crossbow barrage and subsequent pursuit. The Chanyu then summoned 80,000 reinforcement troops, inflicting significant casualties and forcing Li Ling to retreat into a valley. Li Ling then discovered that his troops were low in both morale and energy, leading him to search for and kill the many women who were hiding in the wagons and serving as camp followers for his soldiers. Li's forces then battled the Xiongnu on the following day, killing 3,000. He then retreated southeast for the next 4 to 5 days into a large reed swamp, where his forces managed to survive a fire attack. The Chanyu Qiedihou then sent his own son Hulugu Chanyu to lead the pursuit, only to suffer further casualties when Li Ling's forces took refuge in a forest and repelled the attack with their crossbows, field artillery, and melee combat resistance. At this point, the Chanyu began to suspect that Li Ling was planning to draw his forces into an ambush close to the Han border, but decided to intensify the attacks as he considered it humiliating to be unable to defeat such a small force.

Li Ling's situation worsened as the Xiongnu charged over 20 times a day, and were repelled only after suffering another 2,000 casualties. A low-level officer from Li's army, Guan Gan (管敢), defected in retaliation to an insult from his superiors, bringing to the Chanyu news that Li's forces were cut off from supplies and running out of arrows. The Chanyu then pressed on his attacks from small mountain trails, trapping Li Ling's forces in a valley, then proceeding to shoot the Han forces from above the cliffs. Li Ling's men returned fire from the bottom, depleting 500,000 arrows in one day, and were forced to abandon their wagon transports. The 3,000 remaining soldiers were in such a dire state that axles were chopped for use as weapons, and many officers resorted to using daggers for combat. The Xiongnu forces bombarded the Han troops with boulders, killing many.

One night, Li Ling left the camp and refused any followers, claiming that he was planning to assassinate the Chanyu on his own. He returned unsuccessful, lamenting that they were solidly defeated and all going to die. His subordinates suggested the idea of a false surrender, as another Han general Zhao Ponu (趙破奴) previously had done, but Li Ling refused, "Shut up! If I don't die in battle, I'm not a man!" He ordered his troops to destroy their flags and bury their jewels. Every soldier was given some food and supplies, and told to wait and escape at the same time, then scatter. At midnight the breakout began, but no one remained to beat the battle drum. Li Ling and his second-in-command Han Yannian (韓延年), each with only a small escort, rode and fought under the pursuit of several thousand Xiongnu cavalry. After Han was killed in combat, Li Ling cried "I have no face to return and meet the Emperor!", and voluntarily surrendered himself to the Xiongnu. Out of his 5,000 men, only 400 made it out of the encirclement back to the border.

It is recorded that he used a field artillery crossbow that was capable of repeating fire and/or firing multiple bolts to fire at the Xiongnu.

== Aftermath of defection ==
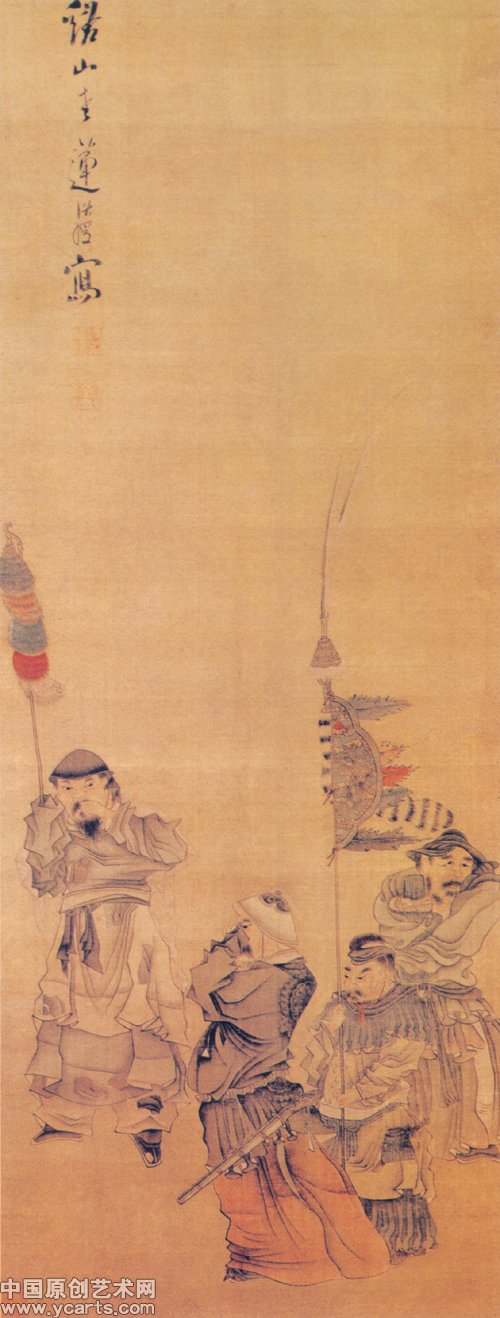
"Su Li Weeping Farewell" by Chen Hongshou, a painter of the Ming dynasty

Emperor Wu initially thought Li Ling was killed in action, and summoned his family to pay tribute. However, he observed no signs of sorrow from Li's family and thus grew suspicious. As the battlefield was not too far from the border, it was not long before news of Li's surrender arrived. The Emperor became furious and ordered the court martial of Chen Bule, who committed suicide upon receiving the message. Public opinion condemned Li as a traitor, and imperial officials began proposing to punish Li's family for his crime of treason. Sima Qian, a senior imperial historian and a friend of Li, was the only person defending him in the Han court. Emperor Wu was offended by Sima's words of defence, taking them as an attack on his brother-in-law Li Guangli, who had also fought against the Xiongnu without much success. Sima was arrested for the crime of grand insult (similar to the crime of lèse-majesté against a European monarch), and was tried and sentenced to death. Although his criminal charges were allowed to be paroled to lesser punishments, Sima Qian was not rich enough to pay for it, so he was forced to accept the commutation to castration and jailed for three years.

The 'disaster of Li Ling' induced China to give up for a time this system of counter-raids, but did not imperil the boundaries of Gansu.

Despite his rage, Emperor Wu soon regretted allowing Li Ling to mobilize so hastily and realized it was a mistake to disregard Lu Bode's suggestion. As a gesture, he rewarded the survivors from Li Ling's regiment.

One year later, Emperor Wu sent Gongsun Ao on a mission to retrieve Li Ling. Gongsun failed to retrieve Li, but captured a Xiongnu soldier who revealed that "Li Shaoqing" was training Xiongnu troops for the Chanyu. Concluding that Li Ling's treachery was evident, Emperor Wu had Li Ling's family executed. In the aftermath, the Li family was seen as a disgrace in Longxi. However, it was later revealed that Li Shaoqing was another high-profile Han defector called Li Xu (李緒), who happened to share the same courtesy name. Li Ling hence bore a deep hatred towards Li Xu, and arranged his assassination.

== Life after defection ==
As a young and high-profile defector, the Chanyu held generous regard of Li Ling, giving Li his daughter's hand in marriage and making Li Lord Youxiao (右校王), the same title as Chanyu's chief adviser (and a notorious Han traitor), Wei Lü (衛律). However, the Xiongnu Queen Dowager (大閼氏) disliked Li Ling and wanted him killed. The Chanyu therefore sent Li Ling to a far northern region, and did not call him back until after the Queen Dowager died.

In 90 BC, Xiongnu invaded Wuyuan twice, Shanggu, and Jiuquan. Emperor Wu ordered a major counteroffensive in three columns against Xiongnu, with Li Guangli leading 70,000 men, Shang Qiucheng (商丘成) leading 30,000 and Mang Tong (莽通) leading 40,000. The Xiongnu responded by having all tribes retreat further north with a scorched earth strategy to challenge the Han army's operational limit. When the forces led by Shang Qiucheng withdrew after meeting no adversary, Xiongnu sent in Li Ling to pursue the Han forces with 30,000 cavalry. The two sides battled for nine days, ironically, at the Altay Mountains. Li Ling was defeated badly by the Han forces, and retreated after suffering heavy casualties.

Li Ling was dispatched twice by the Chanyu to persuade the detained Han ambassador Su Wu to surrender, as Li and Su used to be co-workers and good friends. Initially Li Ling was too ashamed to visit Su Wu, as he defected merely the year after Su's exile to Lake Baikal. On his first visit, Li Ling mentioned how everyone in Su Wu's family back in China had either died or remarried, hoping to sever Su's patriotic bond. Li then said that Emperor Wu had grown old and emotionally unstable, and that he used to feel guilty about defecting but overcame it eventually. However, Su Wu emphasized how much he valued the honor and responsibility the motherland had given him, and told Li Ling that the choice lay between honor and death. Moved by Su Wu's unshakable valor, Li Ling tearfully exclaimed, "Aye! Such an honorable man! I and Wei Lü have sins that dwarf the sky!" The second time Li Ling visited Su Wu, he brought the news that Emperor Wu had died, which caused Su to mourn so hard that he vomited blood and almost died.

When Emperor Zhao of Han took the throne, the coregents Huo Guang and Shangguan Jie, who were both old friends of Li Ling, sent the ambassador Ren Lizheng (任立政), who like Li was from Longxi, to persuade Li to return home. Ren took the opportunity to talk to Li privately, telling him that all his sins could be forgiven, that he needed not worry about wealth after returning and his old friends missed him. However, Li Ling refused, claiming that he had already become a "foreigner" and he couldn't stand to be ashamed a second time.

Li Ling died of disease in 74 BC, after more than 20 years among the Xiongnu as a defector.

== Possible descendants ==
The rulers of the Yenisei Kyrgyz Khaganate from the Are clan claimed Li Ling as their ancestor.

The Book of Southern Qi alleged that the Northern Wei's dynastic clan Tuoba descended from Li Ling, whose Xiongnu wife was named Tuoba; some non-Han peoples possessed the ancient custom of matrilineality.

== Possible palace in Khakassia ==
Some archaeologists have tentatively identified a unique Han-dynasty architecture palace discovered in Russia's Khakassia (southern Siberia) as the residence of Li Ling in the land of the Xiongnu.

In 1940, Russian construction workers found ancient ruins during the construction of a highway between Abakan and the village of Askyz (Аскыз), in Khakassia. When the site was excavated by Soviet archaeologists during 1941–45, they realized that they had discovered a building absolutely unique for the area: a large (1500 square meters) Chinese-style, likely Han dynasty era palace. While the name of the high-ranking personage who lived there is not known, Russian archaeologist L.A. Evtyukhova surmised, based on circumstantial evidence, that the palace may have been the residence of Li Ling (see ru:Ташебинский дворец).

One should note, however, that the "ownership" of the palace continues to be discussed. More recently, for example, it was claimed by A.A. Kovalyov as the residence of Lu Fang (盧芳), a China throne pretender from the Guangwu era.

== See also ==
- Sima Qian; Records of the Grand Historian
- Ban Gu; The Book of Han
- Dupuy, Trevor N.; Curt Johnson; David L. Bongard (1995). The Harper Encyclopedia of Military Biography. Edison, New Jersey: Castle Books. ISBN 0-7858-0437-4.
