= Elegest inscription =

Turkic inscription

The Elegest inscription is a Yenisei Kyrgyz inscription. It was found by J. R. Aspelin in 1888 on the left bank of the river Elegest, Tuva.

== Discovery and translation ==
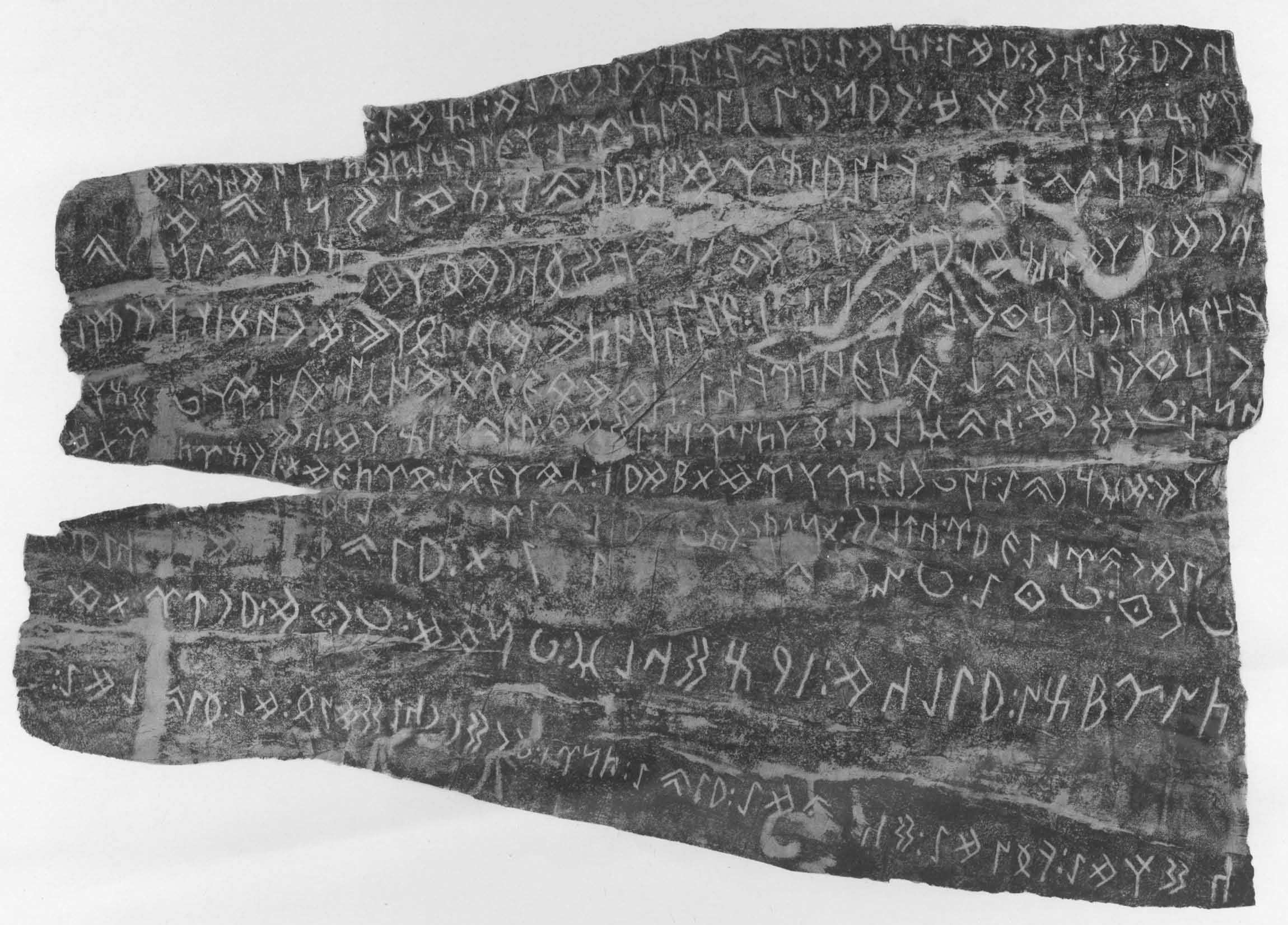
An image of the Elegest inscription

=== Complete text ===
Old Turkic original text:

quyda qunǰuyïm a äsizim a ayït a özdä oγlïm äsizim a adrïltïm a ayït a
yüz är qadašïm uyurïn üčün yüz ärin älig öküzin […]
kök täŋridä kün ay äsiz ärmiš ayït a äsizim a adrïltïm a
qanïm elim a äsizim a ayït a […] bökmädim qanïm elim a ayït a adrïltïm
körtlä qan (Note: The letters <kẄrtlKN> are interpreted by Tekin (1995: 20), Kormušin (1997: 236-237, 2008: 101) and Sertkaya (2017) as körtlä qan. Since the final vowel of körtlä is not written, it is either a mistake in the inscription or the two words were handled by the author as one unit, i.e. a compound. See the inscription Elegest II with plene writing of the vowel in <kẄrtlA> körtlä. Cf. the word körtlä 'beautiful' appearing in other Old Turkic sources. The interpretations kürt el kan by Orkun (1940: 180) and kört äl kan by Malov (1952: 26) are unlikely.) al uruŋu altunlïγ käšig […] bäldä […] toquz säkiz on yašda
uruŋu külig toq bögü tärkän a qaŋïm bäg ärdäm üčün […]
qara bodunïm qatïġlanïŋ el törösin ïdmaŋ ayït a äsiz älim qanïm
elim uγrïnta sü bolïp […] (Note: The runiform letters <rlrmdẅkmYwK> are interpreted by Sertkaya (1995: 739) as er ölürmedüküm yok '(düşman askeri) öldürdüm' and (2010: 211-212) är ölürmädükim 'er (savaşçı) öldürmediğim', whereas Kormušin (2008: 101) reads ärlärmädükim joq 'ja (lično) ne poražal voinov (vraga)'.) yoq […] säkiz är […]
elim […]
buŋ baŋa […] bat ärmiš öldim ayït a äsizim a […]
tört adaq yïlqïm säkiz adaqlïγ barïmïm (Note: The phrase säkiz adaqlïγ barïm most likely describes properties or belongings of the pastoral nomads pulled by four legged draught animals on four wheeled carts, hence the number eight.) buŋïm yoq ärdim
qadašïm a äkenim a adrïltïm a ayïta qara bodunïm a adrïltïm ayït a män

English translation:

O my consort in the secluded place! O my sorrow! May thou say! O my son in the valley! O my sorrow! O, I departed. May thou say!
Because of the capability of my hundred kinsmen […] with hundred kinsmen and fifty oxen.
Both the Sun and the Moon in the blue sky were weighed down in sorrow. May thou say! O my sorrow! O, I departed.
O my khan, o my realm! O my sorrow! May thou say! […] I did not get fully satiated. My khan, my realm! May thou say sorrow! I departed.
[I am] Körtlä khan, the Al Uruŋu. […] a golden quiver […] round my waist. I was seventy nine.
O Uruŋu Külig Tok Bögü Tärkän! Because of the merit of my father, the beg […]
Exert yourself my common people! Do not repudiate the unwritten law of the realm! May thou say, my sorrowful people and khan!
My realm set up an army in the right time […] eight men […]
My realm […]
The grief was […] to me. I died. May thou say, o my sorrow! […]
My four legged livestock, my eight legged properties. I did not get grief.
O my kinsmen, o my progeny! I departed. May thou say! O my common people! I departed. May thou say!

Translation by Turk Bitig

Old Turkic original text:

Quyïda : qunčuyïma : esizime : yïta : özde : oγulïm : adïrïldïm : yïta :
jüz er : qadašïm : uyarun : üčün : jüz erin : elig üküzin tekdi :
Kök Teŋiride : kün ay esiz ermiš : esizime : adïrïldïm :
aqanïm elime : esizime : yïta : ... aqanïm elime : esizime : yïta : adïrïldïm :
Kürtel qan al uruŋ altunluγ keš : eginin jütim belimde bandïm : toquz sekiz on yašïm :
uruŋ Külüg Toq : Bögü Terikine : аqanïm bek erdemi üčün : birle bardï
qara : budunum : qatïγlanïŋ : el törüsü : ïdman : : yïta : esiz elim : qanïm
Elim : uγurïnda : sü bolčï : erlerim edükim yoq : ič biligde : bertegmede sekiz : er : sürdim :
Elim : otšïŋa bir qïlnu ...
Buŋ : baŋa : büŋ at ermiš : öldim : yïta : esizime yïlqïn yana :
Tört kü yïlqïm : sekiz adaqlïγ : barïmïm : buŋïm : yoq ertim :
qadašïma : ekenime : adïrïldïm : yïta : qara : budunuma adïrïldïm : yïta : men

English translation:

I left ownerless my wife at hearth, my children orphans in steppe. I lost you, my orphans.
Under the decision of hundred my relatives, a hundred men have filled fifty bulls.
The sun and the moon ownerless in blue Tengri . I left (my people).
To my father, to people, my ownerless orphans... I parted from my father, people, my ownerless orphans.
I tied a belt bow in gold quiver from Kürtel-khan Al Urung at the age of seventy nine.
My father Urung Külüg Toq Bögü Terikin, in the name of valor lords, came together.
My people, be firm. The governor of people has left. Deserted people, ownerless relatives.
I had not allowed soldiers to fall for my people fortune. I had captivated eight soldiers being in board.
For sake of victories of my people, making...
The grief for me was on hundred horses. I have died. My ownerless orphan horses.
My four best horses, my eight-legged house, I had no grief (before).
I parted from relatives, my ownerless common people, the orphans.
