= Yenisei Kyrgyz =

Former state and ethnic population

𐰶𐰃𐰺𐰴𐰕 Qyrqyz

Languages
- Old Turkic

Religion
- Tengrism, Buddhism

Related ethnic groups
- Türgesh, Toquz Oghuz, Göktürks, Xueyantuo, Shatuo

The Yenisei Kyrgyz (Old Turkic: 𐰶𐰃𐰺𐰴𐰕:𐰉𐰆𐰑𐰣, romanized: Qırqız bodun) were an ancient Turkic people who dwelled along the upper Yenisei in the southern portion of the Minusinsk Hollow from the 3rd century BCE to the 13th century CE. The heart of their homeland was the forested Tannu-Ola mountain range (known in ancient times as the Lao or Kogmen mountains), in modern-day Tuva, just north of Mongolia. The Sayan Mountains were also included in their territory at different times.

== Origins ==
The Yenisei Kyrgyz were a nomadic people who inhabited the Upper Yenisei. According to the Miscellaneous Morsels from Youyang, written by Duan Chengshi in the 9th century, the Kyrgyz considered themselves descendants of a god and a cow that had mated in a cave:

The Jiankun (堅昆) [Qirghiz] tribe, [unlike the Türks], is not of wolf descent. Their ancestors were born in a cave located to the north of the Quman Mountain. They themselves say that in the ancient times there was a god who mated with a cow in that cave. The people's hair is yellow, eyes are green, and beards are red.

In Chinese historical sources, the Kyrgyz are distinguished from the Uyghurs and other Tiele tribes. The Xin Tangshu, which contains detailed information about the Kyrgyz, describes their distinctive physical appearance: "The people are all tall and big and have red hair, white faces, and green eyes" (人皆長大，赤髮、皙面、綠瞳).

According to the Xin Tangshu, a neighboring tribe known as the Boma (駁馬) or Bila (弊剌) resembled the Kyrgyz, although their language was different. This may indicate that the Kyrgyz were not originally a Turkic-speaking people, but underwent Turkification, at least partially, through intertribal marriages during the period of the First Turkic Khaganate. In the case of Are (阿熱), a ruler of the Kyrgyz, his wife was of Karluk origin, while his mother was of Türgesh origin. In addition, the Xin Tangshu states that the Kyrgyz "mixed with the Dingling" (其種雜丁零). At any rate, the (red-haired) Qirghiz "found dark hair ominous (以黑髮為不祥)" and "regarded those with black eyes as descending from [Li] Ling (李陵)", a Chinese general who had defected to the Xiongnu.

The modern descendants of the Yenisei Kyrgyz are considered to include the Tian Shan Kyrgyz, Khakas, Southern Altaians, and Fuyu Kyrgyz. The R1a1 lineage, more specifically its subclade R1a1a1b2 (R1a-Z93), occurs at high frequencies among Turkic peoples currently living in the Yenisei River and Altai Mountains regions of Russia, as well as among the Kyrgyz of Kyrgyzstan. This has been interpreted as potentially supporting an Indo-European origin for the Yenisei Kyrgyz.

== History ==
The Yenisei Kyrgyz correlated with the Čaatas culture and may perhaps be correlated to the Tashtyk culture. Their endonym was variously transcribed in Chinese historical texts as Jiegu (結骨), Hegu (紇骨), Hegusi (紇扢斯), Hejiasi (紇戛斯), Hugu (護骨), Qigu (契骨), Juwu (居勿), and Xiajiasi (黠戛斯), but first appeared as Gekun (or Ko-kun; Chinese: 鬲昆) or Jiankun (or Chien-kun; Chinese: 堅昆) in the Shiji and Book of Han, respectively. Peter Golden reconstructs underlying *Qïrğïz < *Qïrqïz< *Qïrqïŕ and suggests a derivation from Old Turkic qïr 'gray' (horse color) plus suffix -q(X)ŕ/ğ(X)ŕ ~ k(X)z/g(X)z.

Around 202 BCE, Xiongnu chanyu Modu conquered the Kyrgyz –then known to Chinese as Gekun (鬲昆), along with the Hunyu (渾庾), Qushe (屈射), Dingling (丁零), and Xinli (薪犁). Duan Chengshi wrote in Miscellaneous Morsels from Youyang that the mythological ancestors of the Kyrgyz tribe (Jiānkūn bùluò 堅昆部落) were "a god and a cow" (神與牸牛), (unlike the Göktürks, whose mythological ancestress was a she-wolf; or the Tiele, whose mythological ancestors were a he-wolf and a daughter of a Xiongnu chanyu), and that Kyrgyz's point of origin was a cave north of the Quman mountains (曲漫山), which was identified with either the Sayan or the Tannu-Ola; additionally, Xin Tangshu mentioned that the Kyrgyz army was stationed next to Qīngshān 青山 "Blue Mountains", calqued from Turkic Kögmän (> Ch. Quman) and the river Kem (> 劍 Jiàn). By the time the Göktürk Empire fell in the eighth century CE, the Yenisei Kyrgyz had established their own thriving state based on the Göktürk model. They had adopted the Orkhon script of the Göktürks and established trading ties with China and the Abbasid Caliphate in the Middle East.

The Kyrgyz khagans of the Kyrgyz Khaganate claimed descent from the Chinese general Li Ling, grandson of the famous Han dynasty general Li Guang. Li Ling was captured by the Xiongnu and defected in the first century BCE and since the Tang imperial Li family also claimed descent from Li Guang, the Kyrgyz khagan was therefore recognized as a member of the Tang imperial family. Emperor Zhongzong of Tang had said to them that "Your nation and Ours are of the same ancestral clan (Zong). You are not like other foreigners."

In 758, the Uyghurs killed the Kyrgyz khagan and the Kyrgyz came under the rule of the Uyghur Khaganate. However, the Yenisei Kyrgyz spent much of their time in a state of rebellion. In 840 they succeeded in sacking the Uyghur capital, Ordu-Baliq in Mongolia's Orkhon Valley and driving the Uyghurs out of Mongolia entirely. On February 13, 843 at "Kill the Foreigners" Mountain, the Tang Chinese inflicted a devastating defeat on the Uyghur qaghan's forces. But rather than replace the Uyghurs as the lords of Mongolia, the Yenisei Kyrgyz continued to live in their traditional homeland and exist as they had for centuries. The defeat and collapse of the Uyghur Khaganate triggered a massive migration of Uyghurs from Mongolia into Turfan, Kumul and Gansu, where they founded the kingdom of Qocho and the Ganzhou Uyghur Kingdom.

When Genghis Khan came to power in the early 13th century, the Yenisei Kyrgyz submitted peacefully to him and were absorbed into his Mongol Empire, putting an end to their independent state. During the time of the Mongol Empire, the territory of the Yenisei Kyrgyz in northern Mongolia was turned into an agricultural colony called Kem-Kemchik. Kublai Khan, who founded the Yuan dynasty, also sent Mongol and Han officials (along with colonists) to serve as judges in the Kyrgyz and Tuva regions.

Some of the Yenisei Kyrgyz were relocated into the Dzungar Khanate by the Dzungars. In 1761, after the Dzungars were defeated by the Qing dynasty, some Öelet, a tribe of Oirat-speaking Dzungars, were deported to the Nonni basin in northeastern China (Manchuria) and a group of Yenisei Kyrgyz were also deported along with the Öelet. The Kyrgyz who moved to northeastern China became known as the Fuyu Kyrgyz, but they have now mostly merged with the Mongol and Chinese population.

== Language ==
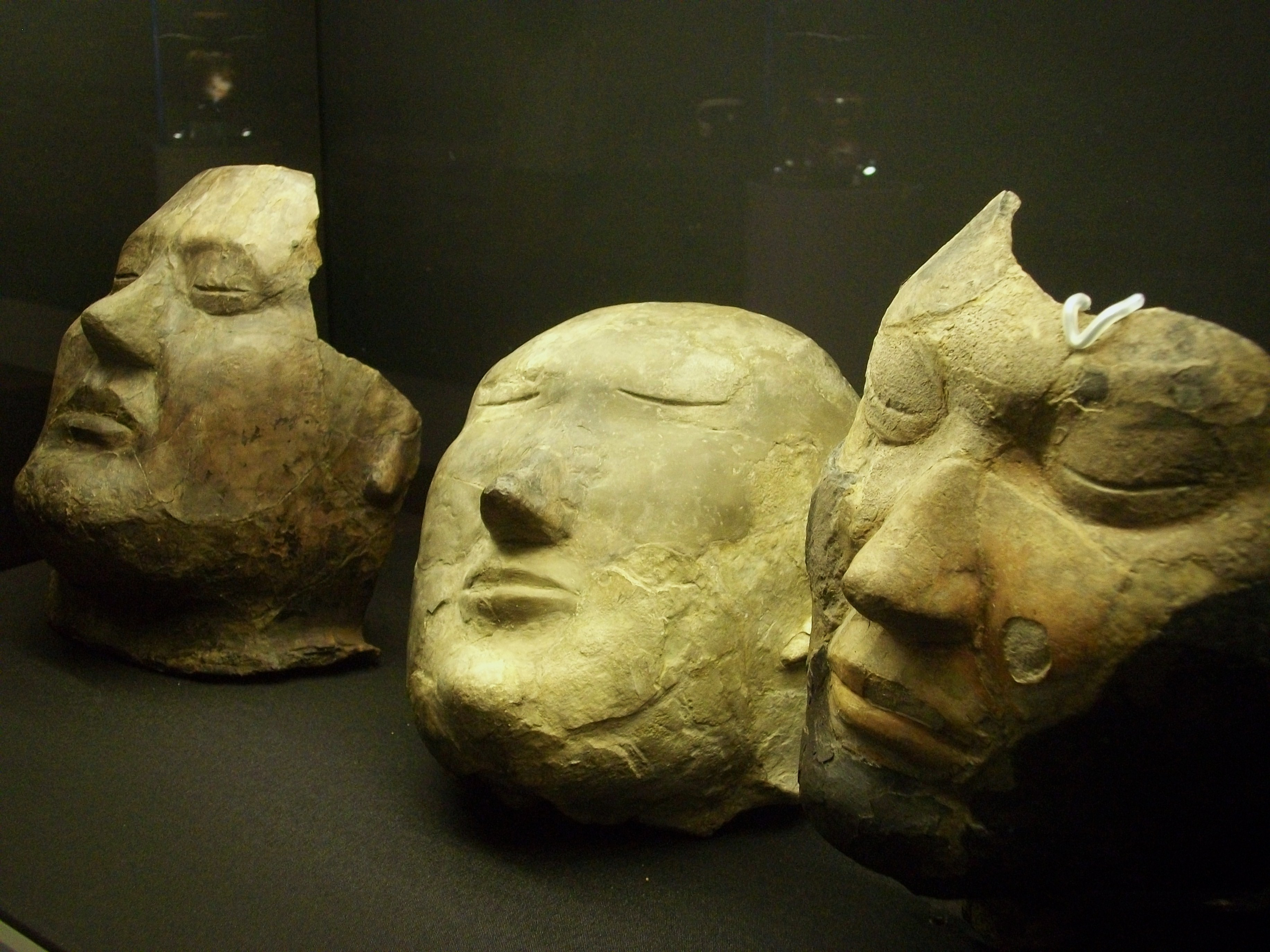
Funerary mask, towards the end of the Tashtyk culture, at the time when the Yenisei Kyrgyz were taking over the region. 5th-6th century CE.

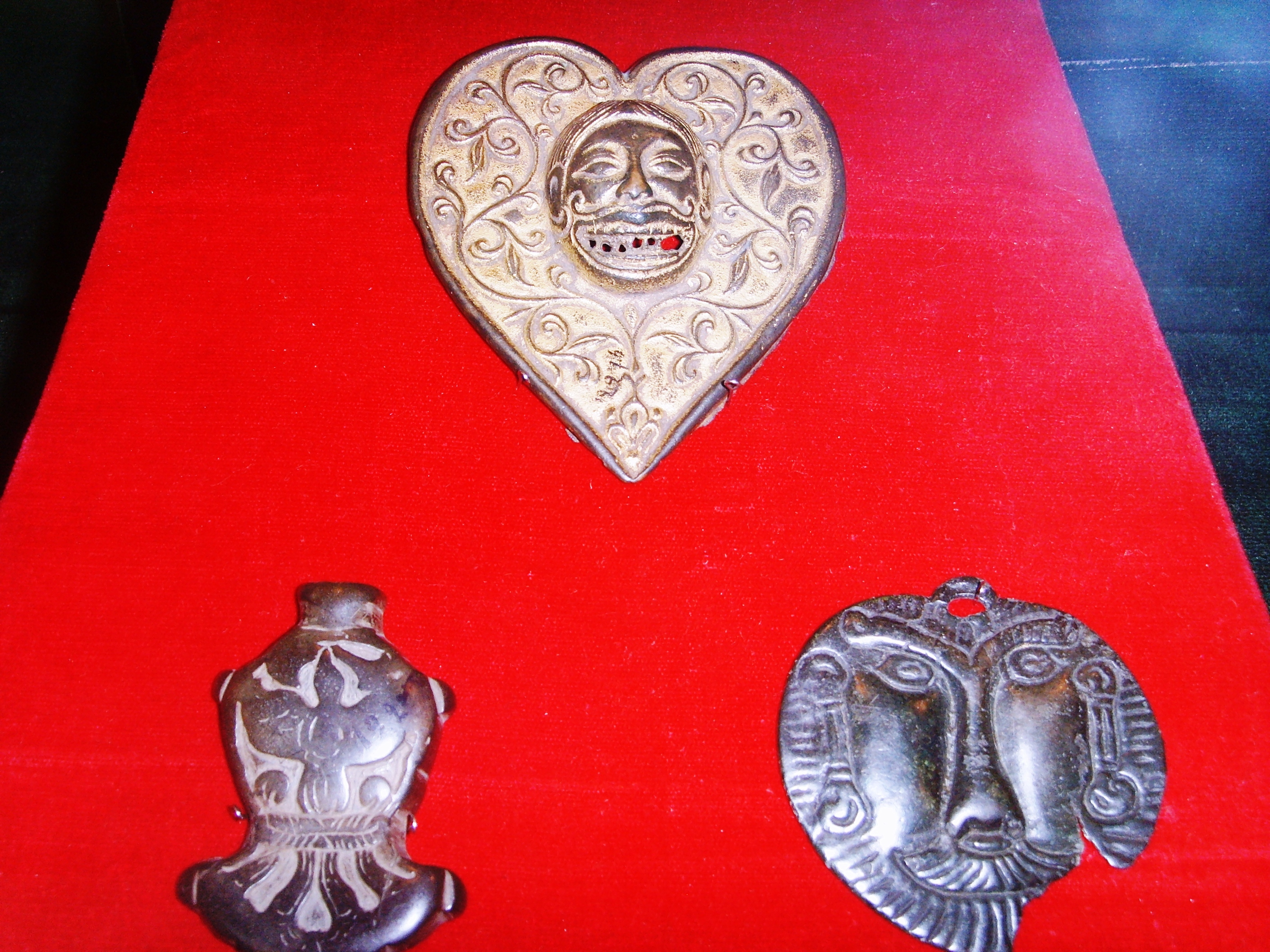
Yenisei Kyrgyz artefacts

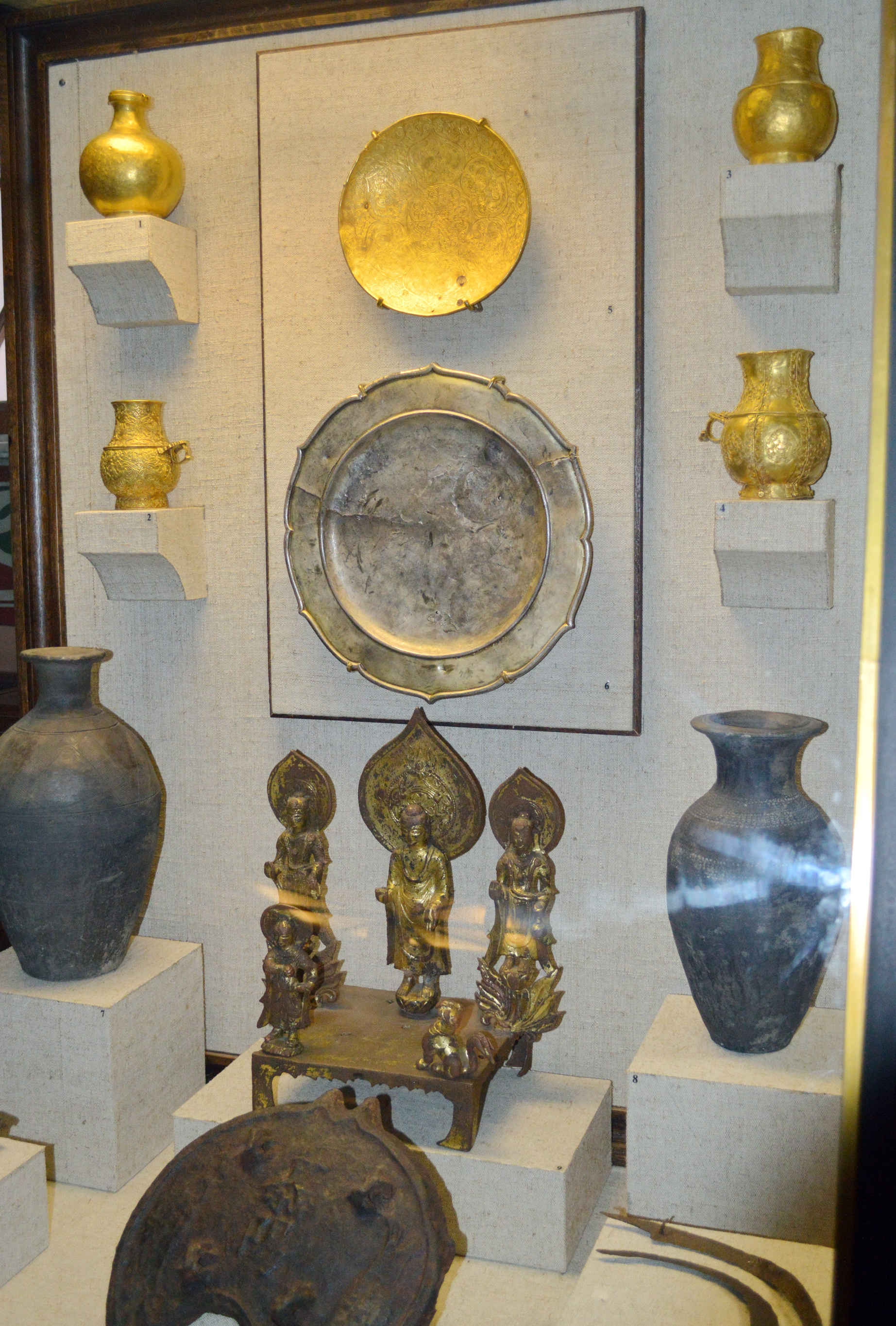
Yenisei Kyrgyz tableware and altar

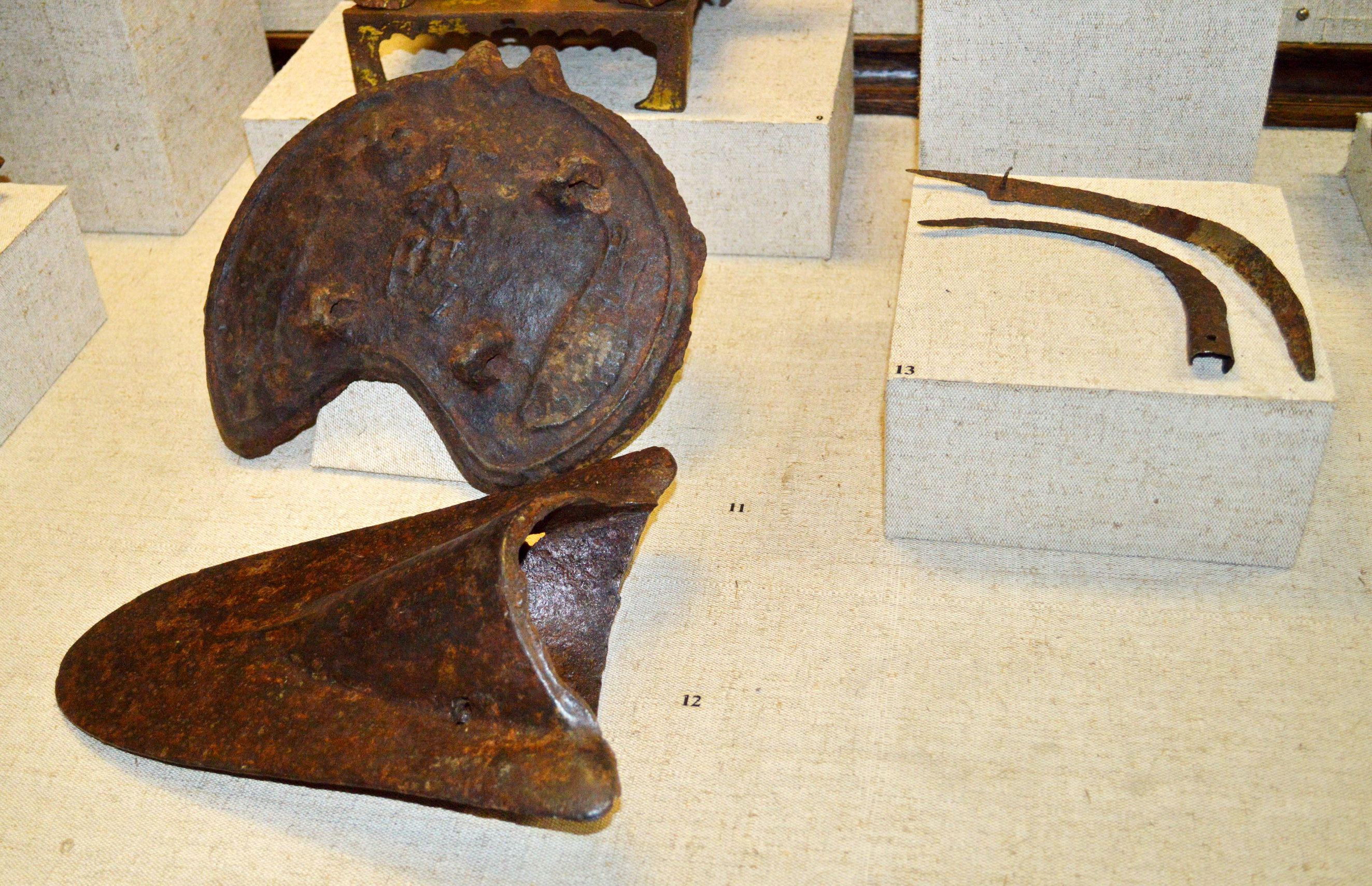
Yenisei Kyrgyz agricultural tools

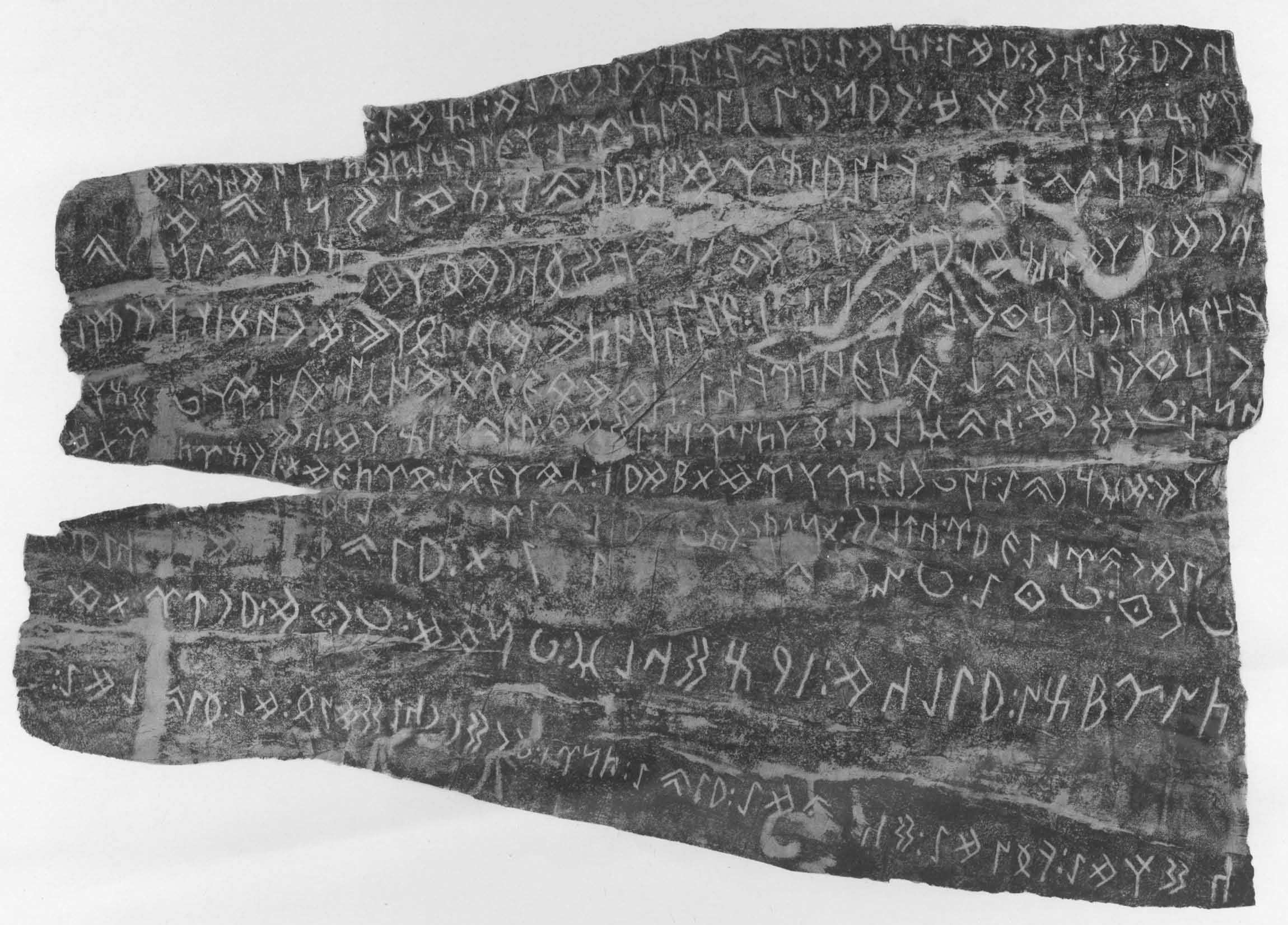
Elegest inscription

The Tang Huiyao (961 CE), citing the Protector General of Anxi Ge Jiayun, states that the Kyrgyz, known to the Chinese as the Jiankun, all had red hair and green eyes. The ones with dark eyes and black hair were believed to be descended from Li Ling, a Han dynasty general whom the Kyrgyz claimed to have married a Kyrgyz woman and was sent to aid in their governance after he surrendered to the Xiongnu. The name Jiankun was later changed to Xiajiasi; according to a translation clerk, Xiajiasi meant "yellow head and red face" and this was what the Uyghurs called them; Pulleyblank (1990) proposes that "yellow head and red face" was a folk etymology based on Turkic qizqil ~ qïzïl "red".

From Xiajiasi 黠戛斯, Soviet scientists constructed the new exonym Khakass. Edwin G. Pulleyblank surmises that "red face and yellow head" meaning was possibly a folk etymology provided by an interpreter who explained the ethnonym based on Turkic qïzïl ~ qizqil, meaning 'red'. The description of the Kyrgyz as "large, with red hair, white faces, and green or blue eyes" in Tang Chinese sources have tempted a number of researchers to assume that the Kyrgyz may have originally been non-Turkic or at least an ethnically mixed people. Ligeti cited the opinions of various scholars who had proposed to see them as assimilated Germanic, Slav, or Ket, while he himself, following Castrén and Schott, favoured an assimilated Samoyed origin on the basis of an etymology for a supposed Kyrgyz word qaša or qaš for "iron". However Pulleyblank argued:

As far as I can see the only basis for the assumption that the Kirghiz were not originally Turkic in language is the fact that they are described as blonds, hardly an acceptable argument in the light of present day ideas about the independence of language and race. As Ligeti himself admitted, other evidence about the Kirghiz language in Tang sources shows clearly that at that time they were Turkic speaking and there is no earlier evidence at all about their language. Even the word qaša or qaš may, I think, be Turkic. The Tongdian says: "Whenever the sky rains iron, they gather it and use it. They call it jiasha (LMC kiaa-şaa). They make knives and swords with it that are very sharp." The Tang Huiyao is the same except that it leaves out the foreign word jiasha. "Raining iron" must surely refer to meteorites. The editor who copied the passage into the Xin Tangshu unfortunately misunderstood it and changed it to, "Whenever it rains, their custom is always to get iron," which is rather nonsensical. Ligeti unfortunately used only the Xin Tangshu passage without referring to the Tongdian. His restoration of qaša or qaš seems quite acceptable but I doubt that word simply meant "iron". It seems rather to refer specifically to "meteorite" or "meteoric iron".

American Turkologist Michael Drompp notes that the connection between language and race is highly inconclusive and the physical appearance of the Kyrgyz is no more credible an indicator of non-Turkic origin than a few possibly non-Turkic words in their lexicon, whose presence can be explained through linguistic borrowing. Yenisei Kyrgyz inscriptions in the eighth century and later are written completely in the Turkic language and Tang Chinese sources clearly state that the Kyrgyz wrote and spoke a language identical to the Uyghurs. Drompp states that there is no reason to assume the Kyrgyz were non-Turkic in origin, although such a possibility cannot be discounted.

According to Lee & Kuang, who cite Chinese historical descriptions as well as genetic data, the turcophone "Qirghiz" may have been of non-Turkic origin, and were later Turkified through inter-tribal marriage. The Kyrgyz were described in the You yang za zu by Duan Chengshi in the 9th century AD as people with yellow hair, green eyes, and red beards. According to Duan, the Kyrgyz were not of wolf descent, unlike the Turks, and were born in a cave north of Quman Mountain as the offspring of a god and a cow. The New Book of Tang (11th century) did not consider the Kyrgyz to be the same as the Tiele tribes but states that they had the same language and script as the Uyghurs. The New Book states that the Kyrgyz were "all tall and big and have red hair, white faces, and green eyes." They looked similar to the neighboring "Boma tribe" (Basmyl), who did not share the same language, implying that the Kyrgyz may have originally been a non-Turkic people. Lee & Kuang consider the Kyrgyz to have been physically distinct from the "Kök Türks" because no similar description of their appearance exists while Ashina Simo's ancestry was called into question for his "Hu" Sogdian appearance. Gardizi believed the red hair and white skin of the Kyrgyz was explained by mixing with the "Saqlabs" (Slavs) while the New Book states that the Kyrgyz intermixed with the Dingling.

== Lifestyle ==
The Yenisei Kyrgyz had a mixed economy based on traditional nomadic animal breeding (mostly horses and cattle) and agriculture. According to Chinese records, they grew Himalayan rye, barley, millet, and wheat. They were also skilled iron workers, jewelry makers, potters, and weavers. Their homes were traditional nomadic tents and, in the agricultural areas, wood and bark huts. Their farming settlements were protected by log palisades. The resources of their forested homeland (mainly fur) allowed the Yenisei Kyrgyz to become prosperous merchants as well. They maintained trading ties with China, Tibet, the Abbasid Caliphate in the Middle east, and many local tribes. Kyrgyz horses were also renowned for their large size and speed. The tenth-century Persian text Hudud al-'alam described the Kirgiz as people who "venerate the Fire and burn the dead", and that they were nomads who hunted.

== Etymology and names ==
The trisyllabic forms with Chinese -sz for Turkic final -z appear only from the end of 8th century onward. Before that time we have a series of Chinese transcriptions referring to the same people and stretching back to the 2nd century BCE, which end either in -n or -t:

- Gekun (EMC kέrjk kwən), 2nd century BCE. Shiji 110, Hanshu 94a.
- Jiankun (EMC khέn kwən), 1st century BCE onward. Hanshu 70.
- Qigu (EMC kέt kwət), 6th century. Zhoushu 50.
- Hegu (EMC γət kwət), 6th century. Suishu 84.
- Jiegu (EMC kέt kwət), 6th–8th century. Tongdian 200, Old Book of Tang 194b, and Tang Huiyao 100.

Neither -n nor -t provides a good equivalent for -z. The most serious attempt to explain these forms seems still to be that of Paul Pelliot in 1920. Pelliot suggested that Middle Chinese -t stands for Turkic -z, which would be quite unusual and would need supporting evidence, but then his references to Mongol plurals in -t suggest that he thinks that the name of the Kirghiz, like that of the Turks, first became known to the Chinese through Mongol speaking intermediaries. There is still less plausibility in the suggestion that the Kirghiz, who first became known as a people conquered by that Xiongnu and then re-emerged associated with other Turkic peoples in the 6th century, should have had Mongol style suffixes attached to all the various forms of their name that were transcribed into Chinese up to the 9th century.

The change of r to z in Turkic which is implied by the Chinese forms of the name Kirghiz should not give any comfort to those who want to explain Mongolian and Tungusic cognates with r as Turkic loanwords. The peoples mentioned in sources of the Han period that can be identified as Turkic were the Dingling (later Tiele, from whom the Uyghurs emerged), the Jiankun (later Kirghiz), the Xinli (later Sir/Xue), and possibly also the Hujie or Wujie, were all, at that period, north and west of the Xiongnu in general area where we find the Kirghiz at the beginning of Tang.
