= Timeline of the Göktürks =

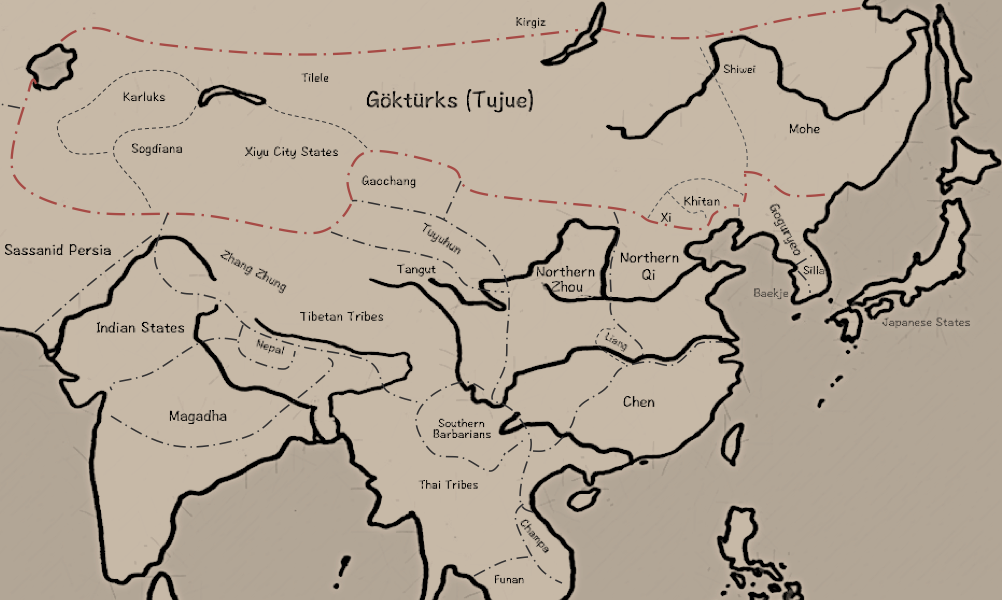
Turkic Khaganate

This is a timeline of the Göktürks from the origins of the Turkic Khaganate to the end of the Second Turkic Khaganate.

== 5th century ==
Year	Date	Event
439		500 families of Xiongnu tribes known as the Ashina residing around modern Turpan are subjugated by the Rouran Khaganate, who resettle them in the Altai Mountains

== 6th century ==
Year	Date	Event
534		Bumin of the Ashina becomes chieftain of the Turks, who migrate further east to the Yellow River
545		The Turks establish an alliance with the Western Wei
546		Bumin of the Turks quells a Tiele revolt for the Rouran Khaganate and asks for a Rouran princess for his service but is denied, after which he declares independence
551		Bumin declares himself Khagan and supreme ruler of the Turks
551		Bumin Qaghan marries Princess Changle of the Western Wei
552		Bumin Qaghan defeats Yujiulü Anagui of the Rouran Khaganate and Anagui commits suicide; Bumin declares himself Illig Khagan of the First Turkic Khaganate after conquering Ötüken; Bumin dies soon after and his son Issik Qaghan succeeds him
553		Issik Qaghan continues attacking the Rouran Khaganate and dies; his brother Muqan Qaghan succeeds him
554		Muqan Qaghan defeats the Rouran Khaganate
557		Battle of Gol-Zarriun: Istämi (brother of Bumin) of the Western Turkic Khaganate makes an alliance with the Sasanian Empire; they attack the Hephthalites
563		Istämi of the Western Turkic Khaganate defeats the Hephthalite Empire in battle
568		Envoys reach the Byzantine Empire asking for them to hand over the Avars, slaves of the Turkic Khaganate
572		Muqan Qaghan dies and is succeeded by his brother Taspar Qaghan
580		Taspar Qaghan marries Princess Qianjin of the Northern Zhou
581		Göktürk civil war: Taspar Qaghan dies and his designated heir Apa Qaghan, son of Muqan Qaghan, goes to war with Ishbara Qaghan, son of Issik Qaghan; Amrak, son of Taspar Qaghan, renounces his claim to the throne
582		Ishbara Qaghan conducts raids on China
583		Göktürk civil war: Apa Qaghan is defeated by Ishbara Qaghan and flees to Tardu, son of Istämi, of the Western Turkic Khaganate
584		Göktürk civil war: Tardu of the Western Turkic Khaganate defeats Ishbara Qaghan of the Eastern Turkic Khaganate
585		Ishbara Qaghan of the Eastern Turkic Khaganate is defeated by the Sui dynasty
587		Ishbara Qaghan of the Eastern Turkic Khaganate dies and is succeeded by his brother Bagha Qaghan, who captures Apa Qaghan
588		Perso-Turkic war of 588–589: Bagha Qaghan of the Eastern Turkic Khaganate invades Herat but is defeated and dies from a stray arrow; he is succeeded by Tulan Qaghan, son of Ishbara Qaghan
597		Tulan Qaghan of the Eastern Turkic Khaganate attacks Yami Qaghan, son of Bagha Qaghan, and forces him to flee to the Sui dynasty
599		Tulan Qaghan of the Eastern Turkic Khaganate is killed by his subordinates and is succeeded by Yami Qaghan, son of Bagha Qaghan, while Tardu of the Western Turkic Khaganate declares himself ruler of all Turks
599		Tardu of the Western Turkic Khaganate attacks the Sui dynasty

== 7th century ==
Year	Date	Event
600		Tardu of the Western Turkic Khaganate attacks the Sui dynasty
602		Tardu of the Western Turkic Khaganate attacks Yami Qaghan of the Eastern Turkic Khaganate in Ordos
603		Tardu of the Western Turkic Khaganate is ousted and flees to the Tuyuhun; he is succeeded by Heshana Qaghan, great-grandson of Tardu
605		Yami Qaghan of the Eastern Turkic Khaganate attacks the Khitans on behalf of the Sui dynasty
605		Heshana Qaghan of the Western Turkic Khaganate is forced to flee to the Sui dynasty due to a rebellion
610		Heshana Qaghan of the Western Turkic Khaganate is defeated by Shikui Khagan, grandson of Tardu, who succeeds him
611		Yami Qaghan of the Eastern Turkic Khaganate is succeeded by his son Shibi Qaghan
611		Heshana Qaghan flees to the Sui dynasty
615		Shibi Qaghan of the Eastern Turkic Khaganate attacks the Sui dynasty.
617		Shibi Qaghan of the Eastern Turkic Khaganate aids Emperor Gaozu of Tang in his rebellion against the Sui dynasty
617		Shikui Khagan of the Western Turkic Khaganate is succeeded by his brother Tong Yabghu Qaghan
618		Heshana Qaghan is killed by envoys from the Eastern Turkic Khaganate
619		Shibi Qaghan of the Eastern Turkic Khaganate is succeeded by his brother Ashina Xichun
620		Ashina Xichun of the Eastern Turkic Khaganate is succeeded by his brother Illig Qaghan
622		Illig Qaghan of the Eastern Turkic Khaganate attacks the Tang dynasty
624		Illig Qaghan of the Eastern Turkic Khaganate and his nephew Tölis Qaghan invade the Tang dynasty but Li Shimin contacts Tölis and persuades him not to attack, forcing the invasion to a halt
625		Illig Qaghan of the Eastern Turkic Khaganate conducts raids on the Tang dynasty but is repulsed
626		Illig Qaghan of the Eastern Turkic Khaganate invades the Tang dynasty and the newly crowned Emperor Taizong of Tang agrees to payments of tribute
627		Perso-Turkic war of 627–629: Tong Yabghu Qaghan of the Western Turkic Khaganate attacks the Sasanian Empire and captures Derbent and Tbilisi
627		The Karluks revolt against the Western Turkic Khaganate
627		Tang and Uyghur forces engage in battle with the Turks and Tibetans.
628		The Xueyantuo and Kumo Xi revolt against the Eastern Turkic Khaganate
630		Tang campaign against the Eastern Turks: Illig Qaghan of the Eastern Turkic Khaganate is defeated by Li Jing of the Tang dynasty and captured by Li Shiji but released; the Eastern Turkic Khaganate becomes a vassal of Tang
630		Xuanzang visits the court of Tong Yabghu Qaghan of the Western Turkic Khaganate
630		Tong Yabghu Qaghan of the Western Turkic Khaganate is murdered by his uncle Külüg Sibir
630		Külüg Sibir of the Western Turkic Khaganate is killed by Sy Yabghu Qaghan, son of Tong Yabghu Qaghan
630		The Western Turkic Khaganate disintegrates into two loose tribal confederations, the western Nushibi and eastern Duolu, collectively known as the On Oq (Ten Arrows)
632		Sy Yabghu Qaghan of the Western Turkic Khaganate is ousted; he is succeeded by Duolu Qaghan, son of Bagha Shad, a close kinsman of Tong Yabghu Qaghan
634		Duolu Qaghan of the Western Turkic Khaganate abdicates and is succeeded by his brother Ishbara Tolis
638		Ishbara Tolis of the Western Turkic Khaganate is ousted in favor of Yukuk Shad, son of Illig Qaghan
639		Ashina Jiesheshuai attempts to assassinate Emperor Taizong of Tang but fails
642		Yukuk Shad of the Western Turkic Khaganate flees west and is replaced by Irbis Seguy, grandson of Ishbara Tolis
649		Irbis Seguy of the Western Turkic Khaganate flees west, and is replaced by Ashina Helu, a descendant of Istämi
651		Ashina Helu of the Western Turkic Khaganate raids Tingzhou
653		Zhenzhu Yabgu attacks Ashina Helu of the Western Turkic Khaganate
656		Karluk and Türgesh forces of the Western Turkic Khaganate are defeated by Cheng Yaojin
657		Battle of Irtysh River: Ashina Helu of the Western Turkic Khaganate is defeated by Su Dingfang of the Tang dynasty
658		Conquest of the Western Turks: Ashina Helu of the Western Turkic Khaganate is defeated by Su Dingfang of the Tang dynasty and lives out the rest of his days in Chang'an; the Western Turkic Khaganate is annexed by Tang
660		Remnants of the Western Turkic Khaganate join the Tibetan Empire in attacking Shule (Kashgar)
665		Remnants of the Western Turkic Khaganate join the Tibetan Empire in attacking Yutian (Hotan)
677		Remnants of the Western Turkic Khaganate join the Tibetan Empire in capturing Qiuci (Kucha)
679		Ashide Wenfu and Ashide Fengzhi of the Chanyu Protectorate make Ashina Nishufu a Khagan and revolt against Tang dynasty.
680		Pei Xingjian defeats Ashina Nishufu and Ashina Nishufu is killed by his men.
680		Ashide Wenfu makes Ashina Funian a khagan and revolts against the Tang dynasty.
681		Ashide Wenfu and Ashina Funian surrender to Pei Xingjian.
681		Ilterish Qaghan revolts with the remnants of Ashina Funian's men.
682		Ilterish Qaghan declares the Second Turkic Khaganate
682		Ilterish Qaghan of the Second Turkic Khaganate attacks the Tang dynasty
683		Ilterish Qaghan of the Second Turkic Khaganate attacks the Tang dynasty
684		Ilterish Qaghan of the Second Turkic Khaganate attacks the Tang dynasty
685		Ilterish Qaghan of the Second Turkic Khaganate attacks the Tang dynasty
687		Ilterish Qaghan of the Second Turkic Khaganate attacks the Tang dynasty
692		Ilterish Qaghan of the Second Turkic Khaganate dies and is succeeded by his brother Qapaghan Qaghan
693		Qapaghan Qaghan of the Second Turkic Khaganate conducts raids against the Tang dynasty
694		Qapaghan Qaghan of the Second Turkic Khaganate conducts raids against the Tang dynasty
696		Qapaghan Qaghan of the Second Turkic Khaganate defeats the Khitans to the east and raids the Tang dynasty
697		Qapaghan Qaghan of the Second Turkic Khaganate conducts raids against the Tang dynasty
698		Qapaghan Qaghan of the Second Turkic Khaganate conducts raids against the Tang dynasty

== 8th century ==
Year	Date	Event
702		Qapaghan Qaghan of the Second Turkic Khaganate conducts raids against the Tang dynasty
706		Qapaghan Qaghan of the Second Turkic Khaganate conducts raids against the Tang dynasty
707		Qapaghan Qaghan of the Second Turkic Khaganate conducts raids against the Tang dynasty
711		Battle of Bolchu: Qapaghan Qaghan of the Second Turkic Khaganate defeats the Turgesh
713		Qapaghan Qaghan of the Second Turkic Khaganate sends an army to aid Soghd against the Umayyad Caliphate but is defeated and retreats the following year
716	22 July	Qapaghan Qaghan of the Second Turkic Khaganate is killed in an ambush and Bilge Qaghan, son of Ilterish Qaghan, succeeds him.
716		Tonyukuk memorial erected near Orkhon river.
720		Bilge Qaghan of the Second Turkic Khaganate invades the Tang dynasty and extracts tribute
731	27 February	Death of Kul Tigin.
734	25 November	Bilge Qaghan of the Second Turkic Khaganate is assassinated and his son Yollıg Khagan succeeds him only to die in the same year; he is replaced by his brother Tengri Qaghan under the care of his mother Qutluğ Säbäg Qatun
741		Tengri Qaghan of the Second Turkic Khaganate is murdered by Pan Kültiğin, one of his shads (governors), who is then defeated by the Basmyl, and Kutluk Yabgu Khagan, son of Ilterish Qaghan succeeds him
742		The Basmyl, Uyghurs, and Karluks revolt against the Second Turkic Khaganate and Kutluk Yabgu Khagan is killed; Özmiş Khagan, son of Pan Kültiğin, succeeds him
744		The Uyghurs dismantle the Second Turkic Khaganate, establishing the Uyghur Khaganate; Özmiş Khagan is killed

== Bibliography ==
- Andrade, Tonio (2016), The Gunpowder Age: China, Military Innovation, and the Rise of the West in World History, Princeton University Press, ISBN 978-0-691-13597-7.
- Asimov, M.S. (1998), History of civilizations of Central Asia Volume IV The age of achievement: A.D. 750 to the end of the fifteenth century Part One The historical, social and economic setting, UNESCO Publishing
- Barfield, Thomas (1989), The Perilous Frontier: Nomadic Empires and China, Basil Blackwell
- Barrett, Timothy Hugh (2008), The Woman Who Discovered Printing, Great Britain: Yale University Press, ISBN 978-0-300-12728-7 (alk. paper)
- Beckwith, Christopher I (1987), The Tibetan Empire in Central Asia: A History of the Struggle for Great Power among Tibetans, Turks, Arabs, and Chinese during the Early Middle Ages, Princeton University Press
- Biran, Michal, The Empire of the Qara Khitai in Eurasian History: Between China and the Islamic World, Cambridge University Press
- Bregel, Yuri (2003), An Historical Atlas of Central Asia, Brill
- Drompp, Michael Robert (2005), Tang China And The Collapse Of The Uighur Empire: A Documentary History, Brill
- Ebrey, Patricia Buckley (1999), The Cambridge Illustrated History of China, Cambridge: Cambridge University Press, ISBN 0-521-66991-X (paperback).
- Ebrey, Patricia Buckley; Walthall, Anne; Palais, James B. (2006), East Asia: A Cultural, Social, and Political History, Boston: Houghton Mifflin, ISBN 0-618-13384-4
- Golden, Peter B. (1992), An Introduction to the History of the Turkic Peoples: Ethnogenesis and State-Formation in Medieval and Early Modern Eurasia and the Middle East, OTTO HARRASSOWITZ · WIESBADEN
- Graff, David A. (2002), Medieval Chinese Warfare, 300-900, Warfare and History, London: Routledge, ISBN 0415239559
- Graff, David Andrew (2016), The Eurasian Way of War Military Practice in Seventh-Century China and Byzantium, Routledge, ISBN 978-0-415-46034-7.
- Haywood, John (1998), Historical Atlas of the Medieval World, AD 600-1492, Barnes & Noble
- Kamola, Stefan (2023), I Made Him Praiseworthy: The Kül Tegin Inscription in World History, De Gruyter
- Latourette, Kenneth Scott (1964), The Chinese, their history and culture, Volumes 1-2, Macmillan
- Lorge, Peter A. (2008), The Asian Military Revolution: from Gunpowder to the Bomb, Cambridge University Press, ISBN 978-0-521-60954-8
- Millward, James (2009), Eurasian Crossroads: A History of Xinjiang, Columbia University Press
- Needham, Joseph (1986), Science & Civilisation in China, vol. V:7: The Gunpowder Epic, Cambridge University Press, ISBN 0-521-30358-3
- Rong, Xinjiang (2013), Eighteen Lectures on Dunhuang, Brill
- Shaban, M. A. (1979), The ʿAbbāsid Revolution, Cambridge: Cambridge University Press, ISBN 0-521-29534-3
- Sima, Guang (2015), Bóyángbǎn Zīzhìtōngjiàn 54 huánghòu shīzōng 柏楊版資治通鑑54皇后失蹤, Yuǎnliú chūbǎnshìyè gǔfèn yǒuxiàn gōngsī, ISBN 978-957-32-0876-1
- Sinor, Denis (1990), The Cambridge History of Early Inner Asia, Cambridge University Press, ISBN 978-0-521-24304-9
- Skaff, Jonathan Karam (2012), Sui-Tang China and Its Turko-Mongol Neighbors: Culture, Power, and Connections, 580-800 (Oxford Studies in Early Empires), Oxford University Press
- Wang, Zhenping (2013), Tang China in Multi-Polar Asia: A History of Diplomacy and War, University of Hawaii Press
- Whiting, Marvin C (2002), Imperial Chinese Military History, Writers Club Press
- Wilkinson, Endymion (2015). Chinese History: A New Manual, 4th edition. Cambridge, MA: Harvard University Asia Center distributed by Harvard University Press. ISBN 9780674088467.
- Yuan, Shu (2001), Bóyángbǎn Tōngjiàn jìshìběnmò 28 dìèrcìhuànguánshídài 柏楊版通鑑記事本末28第二次宦官時代, Yuǎnliú chūbǎnshìyè gǔfèn yǒuxiàn gōngsī, ISBN 957-32-4273-7
- Xiong, Victor Cunrui (2000), Sui-Tang Chang'an: A Study in the Urban History of Late Medieval China (Michigan Monographs in Chinese Studies), U OF M CENTER FOR CHINESE STUDIES, ISBN 0892641371
- Xiong, Victor Cunrui (2008), Historical Dictionary of Medieval China, United States of America: Scarecrow Press, Inc., ISBN 978-0810860537
- Xue, Zongzheng (1992), Turkic peoples, 中国社会科学出版社
