= El Bilga Khatun =

Mother of Bilge Qaghan

Khatun of the Second Turkic Khaganate
- Successor: El Etmish Bilge Khatun
- Spouse: Ilterish Qaghan
- Issue: Bilge Qaghan; Kul Tigin; Tonja Tegin
- House: Ashide
- Religion: Tengrism

El Bilga Khatun (Old Turkic: 𐰃𐰠𐰋𐰃𐰠𐰏𐰀:𐰴𐱃𐰆𐰣, romanized: Elbilge qatun; Chinese: 比爾加·哈通; pinyin: Bǐ'ěr jiā·hā tōng) or Ilbilga Katun was the wife of the 8th century Göktürk qaghan, Ilterish Qaghan, the founder of the Second Turkic Khaganate and the mother of Bilge Qaghan, the fourth qaghan of the same khaganate. She is mentioned in the Orkhon inscriptions erected in honor of Bilge Qaghan and his brother, Kul Tigin.

== Orkhon inscriptions ==
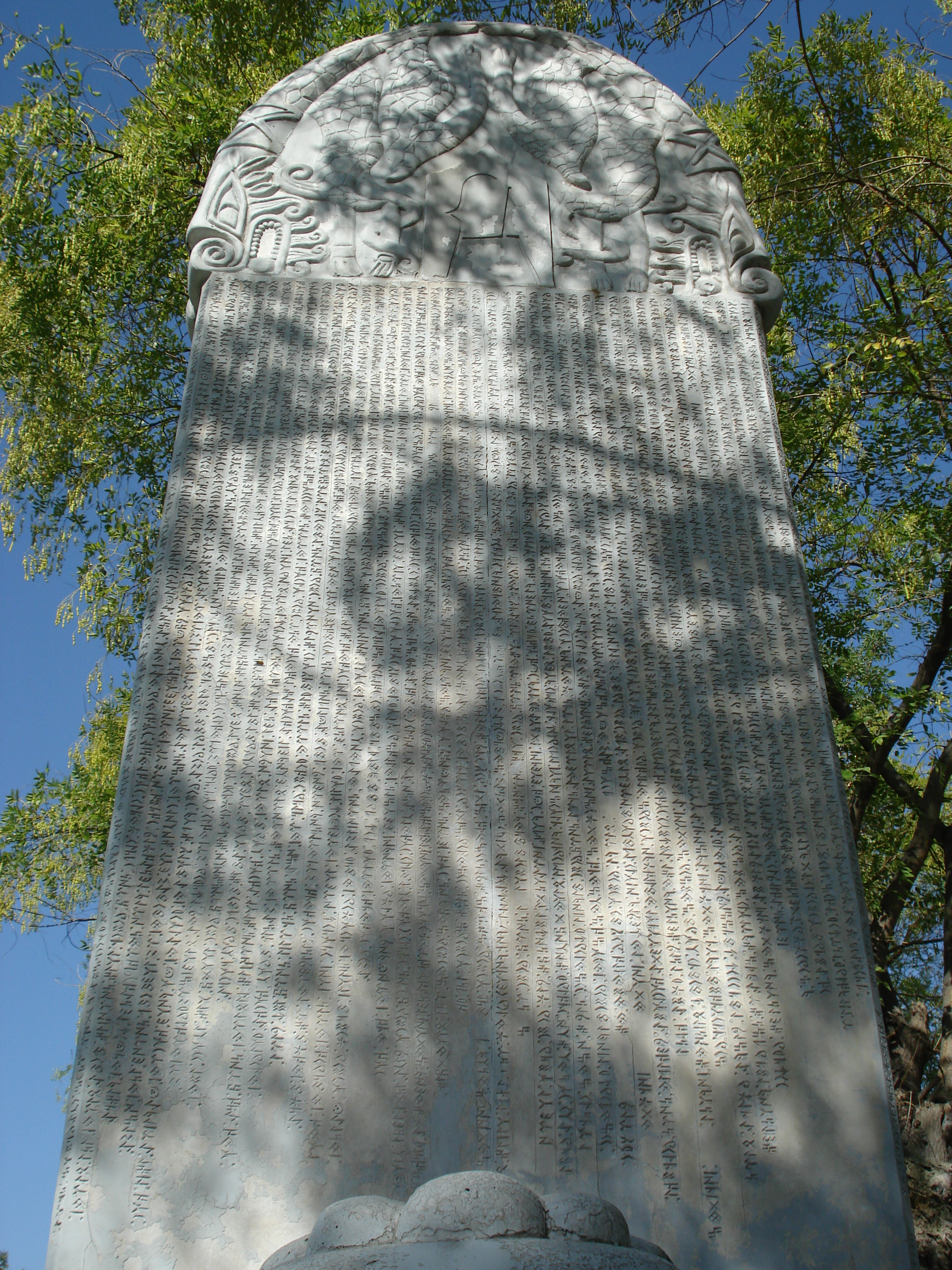
Replica of Bilge Khagan's memorial complex in Gazi University, Ankara.

El Bilga Khatun was the wife of the 8th century Göktürk qaghan, Ilterish Qaghan, the founder of the Second Turkic Khaganate, the mother of Bilge Qaghan, the fourth qaghan of the same khaganate, and also the mother of General Kul Tigin. She is mentioned in the 8th century Orkhon inscriptions, erected in honor of Bilge Qaghan and Kul Tigin. It says:

But the Turks’ Heaven above, and the Turks holy Yer-sub did as follows: to the end that the Turkish people should not perish but that it should [again] become a people, they raised up my father Elterish kagan and my mother Elbilga katun, supporting them from the heights of Heaven."

== Relationship with Ilterish Qaghan ==
According to the Orkhon inscriptions, she was the biggest supporter and helper of her husband. El Bilga Khatun and Ilterish Qaghan were known for their unity which was rare at that time between a husband and wife. When she gave a shaman a goose to eat, the shaman said that she and her husband were taken to heaven and brought back to earth. Another source says that one of the Orkhon inscriptions said, "My father, Ilterish Qaghan, grabbed my mother, El Bilga Khatun, from the top of the sky, so that the Turkish bout (people) would not disappear, so that there would be people." This indicates that their relationship was extremely strong. Recent findings and official Chinese sources support the claim that both Ilterish Qaghan and El Bilga Khatun worked together in state administration.

== Death ==
It is unknown how El Bilga Khatun died, the only thing known about her death or disappearance is that it was during the time when Ilterish and Tonyukuk attacked the Yenisei Kyrgyz. Inel and Tonyukuk were in charge of a special mourning ceremony that was held a while after her death.

== See also ==
- İlbilge Hatun (fictional character), inspired by the historical person
