= Ashina Duoxifu =

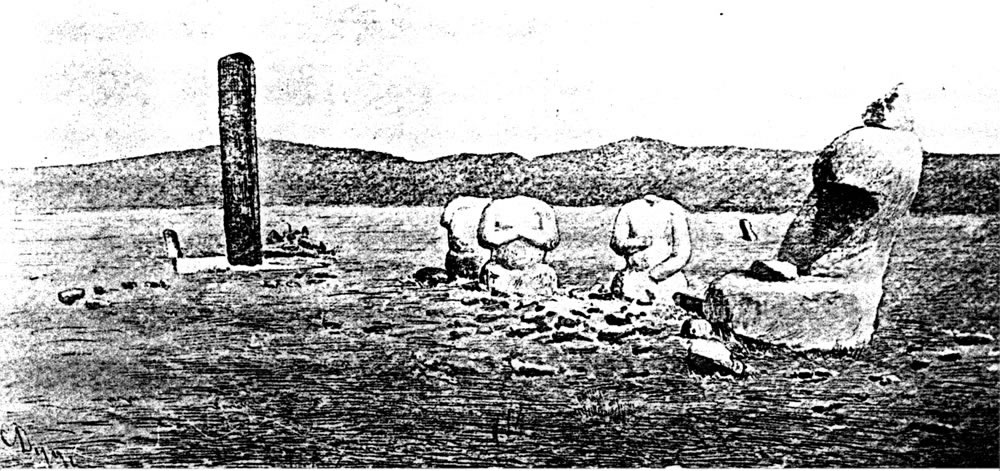
- Sketch of the Ongi Site and memorial complex of Ashina Duoxifu by N. M. Yadrintsev, 1891, (Atlas: PI. XIV).

Eastern Yabghu of the Second Turkic Khaganate
- Reign: 687–716
- Successor: Bilgä Išbara Tamγan Tarqan
- Died: 716
- Issue: Bilgä Išbara Tamγan Tarqan; Išbara Tamγan Čor
Names
- Ashina Duoxifu (阿史那咄悉匐)
- House: Ashina
- Dynasty: Second Turkic Khaganate
- Father: Etmiš Beg
- Religion: Tengrism

Ashina Duoxifu or Eletmiš Yabɣu (Chinese: 阿史那咄悉匐; pinyin: Āshǐnà Duōxīfú; Old Turkic: Turs Beg; Title: Old Turkic: 𐰠𐱅𐰢𐰾𐰖𐰉𐰍𐰆, romanized: Eletmiš Yabɣu) was an eastern yabghu of the Second Turkic Khaganate. He was a younger brother of Ilterish Qaghan and Qapaghan Qaghan.

== Life ==
Ashina Duoxifu took part in the Second Turkic Khaganate's war against the Toquz Oγuz with his brother Ilterish Qaghan between 682 and 687 near the Tuul River. He was made governor (šad) of the eastern wing. He was appointed to this position by Ilterish in 687 and was reconfirmed by his other brother Qapaghan Qaghan in 699. He was mainly active in Ongi Steppe (near the Ongi River).

== Family ==
He had several issues:

- Bilgä Išbara Tamγan Tarqan - Might have been the Karluk Yabghu after the collapse of the khaganate.
- Išbara Tamγan Čor - Might have been the Karluk Yabghu after the collapse of the khaganate.
- Pan Kol Tegin - Revolted and killed Tengri Qaghan upon the latter's mother's execution of one of the Yabghus. Placed his son Ozmish on the throne but both were killed by Ashina Shi.
- Uti Beg - His son Ashina Shi revolted after the execution of Tengri Khagan by his uncle Pan Kol Tegin, successfully defeated and killed 2 usurpers: Kutluk Yabghu and Ozmish and declared himself as qaghan. Shi's death after a Karluk-Uyghur coalition marked the end of Second Turkic Khaganate.

== Death and legacy ==
He was killed by Kol Tegin as a part of coup against Inel Qaghan in 716. He was succeeded by his son Bilgä Išbara Tamγan Tarqan as he submitted to Bilge Qaghan. His son ordered Ongi Inscription to be erected in his honour.
