= List of khagans of the Göktürks =

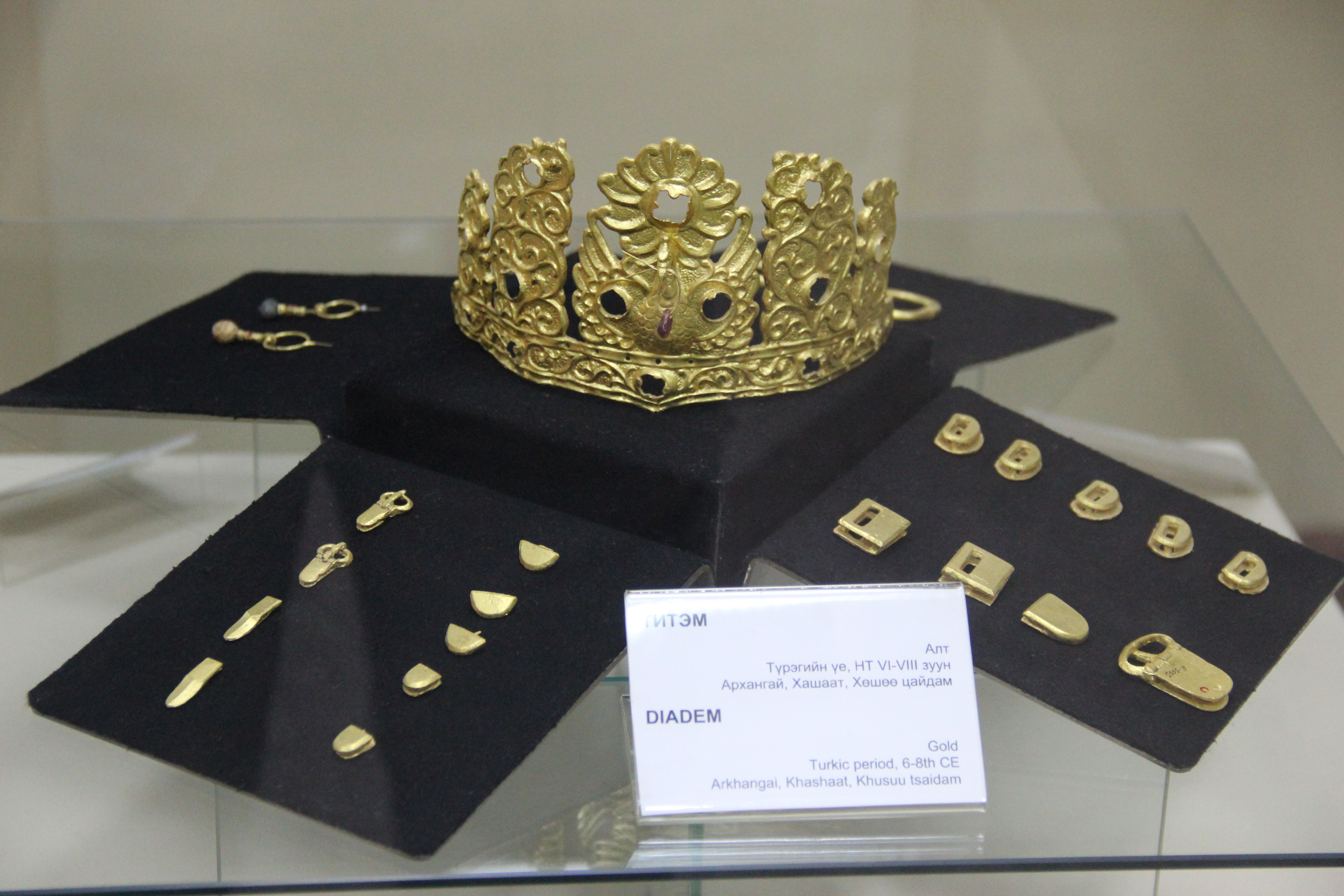
Crown of the Turkic khagans, National Museum of Mongolia

Khagan (Qaghan) was a title used by the Turkic people of the Middle Ages. The First and Second Turkic Khaganate were empires ruled by the Ashina tribe of the Göktürks that controlled much of Central Asia and the Mongolian Plateau between 552 and 745 and composed of confederated Turkic tribes. In the 6th century, they challenged the power of numerous dynasties in the Central Plains. At the end of the century following a civil war, the khaganate was divided into eastern and western wings. In the second half of the 7th century, both wings were defeated by the Tang dynasty. However, in 682 they regained their independence.

== Khagans of the Turkic Khaganate ==
Title	Personal name and other titles	Qatun	Reign	Note
Bumin Qaghan / Illig Qaghan (Yii) (伊利可汗)	"Tumen" (土門 / 土门)	Princess Changle (長樂公主 / 长乐公主); From Western Wei	552	
Issik Qaghan (乙息記可汗 / 乙息记可汗)	Kara 卡拉		552–553	Son of Bumin Qaghan
Muqan Qaghan 木桿可汗 / 木杆可汗	Yandou / Yen-to (燕都 / 俟斤)		553–572	Son of Bumin Qaghan
Taspar Qaghan (Tuobo) (佗缽可汗 / 佗钵可汗)			572–581	Son of Bumin Qaghan
Unknown title	Anluo / An-lo (庵邏 / 庵逻)		581	Son of Tapir Qaghan
Ishbara Qaghan (Shabolue) (沙缽略可汗 / 沙钵略可汗)	Shetu / She-t'u (攝圖 / 摄图); Il Kul Shad Bagha Ishbara Qaghan (伊利俱盧設莫何始波羅可汗 / 伊利俱卢设莫何始波罗可汗)	Princess Qianjin of Northern Zhou (千金公主); After the fall of the Northern Zhou, she was given surname Yang and became Princess Dayi of Sui (大義公主 / 大义公主)	581–587	Son of Issik Qaghan
Bagha Qaghan / Yabgu Qaghan; Mohe Kehan 莫何可汗 / Yehe Kehan 葉護可汗	Chuluohou / Ch'u-lo-hou (處羅侯 / 处罗侯)		587–588	Son of Issik Qaghan
Tulan Qaghan; Dulan Kehan (都藍可汗)	Yongyulü / Yung-yü-lü (雍虞閭 / 雍虞闾)		588–599	Son of Ishbara Qaghan

== Khagans of the western side of the Turkic Khaganate ==
Title	Personal name and other titles	Qatun	Reign	Note
Yabghu Qaghan (葉護可汗 / 叶护可汗)	Istemi; Shidianmi / Shih-tien-mi (室點密 / 室点密)		552–575	Younger brother of Bumin Qaghan
Tardu (Datou) (達頭可汗 / 达头可汗)	Dianjue / Tien-chüeh (玷厥)		575–602	Son of Istemi

== Khagans of Apa line ==
Title	Personal name and other titles	Qatun	Reign	Note
Apa Qaghan (Abo) (阿波可汗)	Daluobian / Ta-lo-pien (大邏便 / 大逻便)		581–587	Son of Muqan Qaghan
Niri Qaghan (Nili) (泥利可汗)			587–601	Son of Yangsu Tigin; Grandson of Tardush Qaghan

== Khagans of the Eastern Turkic Khaganate ==
Title	Personal name and other title	Qatun	Reign	Note
Yami Qaghan (Qimin) (啟民可汗 / 启民可汗)	Rangan / Jan-kan (染干); Tölis Qaghan (突利可汗 / 突利可汗)	Princess Anyi (597–599) (安義公主 / 安义公主); From Sui; Princess Yicheng (599–) (義成公主 / 义成公主); From Sui	599–609	Son of Ishbara Qaghan
Shibi Qaghan (始畢可汗 / 始毕可汗)	Duojishi / To-chi-shih (咄吉世)	Princess Yicheng (義成公主 / 义成公主)	609–619	Son of Yami Qaghan
Chuluo Khan (處羅可汗 / 处罗可汗)	"Ilteber Shad" (俟利弗設 / 俟利弗设)	Princess Yicheng (義成公主 / 义成公主)	619–620	Son of Yami Qaghan
Illig Qaghan (Xieli) (頡利可汗 / 颉利可汗)	Duobi / To-pi (咄苾) "Baghatur Shad" (莫賀咄設 / 莫贺咄设)	Princess Yicheng (義成公主 / 义成公主)	620–630	Son of Yami Qaghan

== Khagans under the Jimi system of Tang dynasty ==
Title	Personal name and other titles	Qatun	Reign	Note
Qilibi Khan (俟力苾可汗)	Simo / Ssu-mo (思摩)		639–644	Son of Tughruq Shad
Chebi Khan (車鼻可汗 / 车鼻可汗)	Hubo / Hu-po (斛勃)		646–649	
Ashina Nishufu	Nizük Beg; Nishoufu / Ni-shou-fu (泥熟匐)		679–680	
	Funian / Fu-nien (伏念)		680–681	Relative of Illig Qaghan

== Khagans of the Western Turkic Khaganate ==
Title	Personal name and other titles	Qatun	Reign	Note
Heshana Khagan (曷娑那可汗, 曷薩那可汗)	Daman (達曼 / 达曼); Nijue Chuluo Kehan (泥厥處羅可汗)	Princess Xinyi (信義公主 / 信义公主)	604–611	Son of Niri Qaghan
Shikui Khagan (射匱可汗 / 射匮可汗)			610–617	Son of Tughluq Yabghu; Grandson of Tardush Qaghan
Tong Yabghu Qaghan (Tongyehu) (統葉護可汗 / 统叶护可汗)			617–630	Son of Tughluq Yabghu; Grandson of Tardush Qaghan
Baghatur Qaghan (莫賀咄可汗 / 莫贺咄可汗)			630	Son of Tughluq Yabghu; Grandson of Tardush Qaghan
Si Yabghu Qaghan (肆葉護可汗 / 肆叶护可汗)	Dieli Tegin (咥力特勒)		630–632	Son of Tuluq Yabghu Qaghan
Tughluq Qaghan (咄陸可汗 / 咄陆可汗)	Nizük (泥孰) (吞阿婁拔奚利咄陸可汗 / 吞阿娄拔奚利咄陆可汗)		632–634	Son of Baghatur Qaghan
Ishbara Tolis (沙缽羅咥利失可汗 / 沙钵罗咥利失可汗)	Tonga / Tongra (同俄)		634–639	Son of Baghatur Qaghan
Illig Beg Tughluq Qaghan (乙毗咄陸可汗 / 乙毗咄陆可汗)	Yukuk Shad (欲谷設 / 欲谷设)		638–642	Grandson of Tughluq Yabghu
Illig Qutlugh Illig Beg Qaghan rival? (乙屈利失乙毘可汗 / 乙屈利失乙毗可汗)			639–640	Son of Ishbara Tolis Qaghan
Illig Beg Ishbara Yabghu Qaghan (rival) (乙毗沙缽羅葉護可汗 / 乙毗沙钵罗叶护可汗)	Tigin (薄布特勒)		639–641	Son of Genna Shad
Illig Beg Shekuei Qaghan (乙毗射匱可汗 / 乙毗射匮可汗)			642–653	Son of Illig Kul Bilge Qaghan; Grandson of Apa Qaghan
Ishbara Qaghan (沙缽羅可汗 / 沙钵罗可汗)	Helu (賀魯 / 贺鲁)		650–658	Son of Böri Shad; Grandson of Tughluq Yabghu

== Xingxiwang khagans ==
Title	Personal name and other titles	Qatun	Reign	Note
Ashina Mishe	(阿史那弥射) (莫贺咄叶护) (奚利邲咄陆可汗)		657–662	
Ashina Duzhī; Onoq Qaghan	(阿史那都支) (十姓可汗)		671–679	
Ashina Yuanqing	(阿史那元庆)		685–692	Son of Ashina Mishe
Ashina Tuizi	(阿史那俀子)		693–694	Son of Ashina Yuanqing
Ashina Xian	(阿史那献)		708–717	Son of Ashina Yuanqing
Ashia Zhèn	(阿史那震)		735–736	Son of Ashina Xian

== Jiwangjue khagans ==
Title	Personal name and other titles	Qatun	Reign	Note
Ashina Buzhen	(阿史那步真)		657–667	
Ashina Huseluo; Jiezhong Shizhu Qaghan	(阿史那斛瑟罗) (竭忠事主可汗)		685–703	Son of Ashina Buzhen
Ashina Huaidao	(阿史那怀道)		704–708	Son of Ashina Huseluo
Ashina Xin	(阿史那昕)		740–742	Son of Ashina Huaidao

== Khagans of the Second Eastern Turkic Khaganate ==
Title	Personal name and other titles	Qatun	Reign	Note
Ilterish Qaghan (頡跌利可汗 / 颉跌利可汗)	Qutlugh (那骨咄祿 / 骨咄禄)	El Bilge Khatun	682–694	Relative of Illig Qaghan
Qapaghan Qaghan (遷善可汗 / 迁善可汗)	Mòchuò (默啜)		694–716	Younger brother of Ilterish Qaghan
Inel Qaghan (拓西可汗)	(匐俱)		716–717	Son of Qapaghan Qaghan
Bilge Qaghan (毗伽可汗)	Bögü (默棘連 / 默棘连)	Qutluğ Säbäg Qatun	717–734	Son of Ilterish Qaghan
Yollıg Khagan (伊然可汗)	-		734-739	Son of Bilge Khagan
Tengri Qaghan (登利可汗)	-		739–741	Son of Bilge Khagan
Kutluk Yabgu Qhagan	(骨咄)		741–742	
Ashina Shi (頡跌伊施可汗 / 颉跌伊施可汗)			742–744	Uti Beg
Özmiş Khagan (烏蘇米施可汗 / 乌苏米施可汗)			742–744	Son of Pan Kul Tigin
White Eyebrow Qaghan (白眉可汗)	Kulun Beg (鶻隴匐 / 鹘陇匐)		744–745	Son of Pan Kul Tigin
El Etmish Kagan			747–759	Son of Bilge Khagan
Bügü Qaghan			759–779	
