= Ashina Shi =

Khagan of the Turkic Khaganate (d. 744)

- Shad of Basmyl

Qaghan
- Reign: 742–744
- Coronation: 742
- Predecessor: Ozmish Qaghan; Kutluk Yabgu Khagan
- Successor: Kutlug I Bilge Khagan
- Born: Ashina Shi 阿史那施
- Died: 744
- House: Ashina
- Father: Uti beg
- Religion: Tengrism

Ilterish Alp Bilgä Qağan (Chinese: 賀臘毗伽可汗; pinyin: Hèlà Píjiā Kèhán) or Eletmiş Qağan (Chinese: 頡跌伊(蜜)施可汗; pinyin: Xiédiēyī(mì)shī Kèhán), personal name Ashina Shi (Chinese: 阿史那施) was the penultimate khagan of Second Turkic Khaganate.

== Background ==
Ashina Shi was a grandson of Ashina Duoxifu through his son Uti Beg thus a grand-nephew to Ilterish and Qapaghan khagans. He was a first cousin of Özmiş Khagan.

== Tengri Qaghan's death and revolt ==
In 740, Emperor Xuanzong of Tang sent his envoy Li Zhi (李質) who declared Bilge Khagan's son Tengri as the new khagan. His mother Qutluğ Säbäg Qatun and chancellor Yusi Tarkhan (飫斯達幹) conspired together to centralize the state and kill the cousins who were ruling as governors in the west and the east. While they succeeded in killing the western shad, the eastern shad Pan Kul Tigin rebelled and marched on the capital. He captured the infant Tengri and executed him, causing his mother to flee. Pan Kul crowned his son Özmiş as khagan in 741 and himself as regent.

After hearing this Shi rose in revolt and marched on the capital. In 742, with the Karluks and Uyghurs support, he was declared the new khagan. Ashina Shi used the title 'Ydyk-kut' along with khagan which can be translated as 'Heaven Sent'. Later he appointed Karluks to the leadership of right wing and Uyghurs to leadership of left wing.

The policy of Tang China was to vassalize all people to the north of Chinese border line and Özmiş Khagan was also expected to pay respect. Initially, Özmiş agreed to visit emperor Xuanzong’s court and pay respect to the emperor, but then changed his mind and tried to keep his independence. His reluctance annoyed the Emperor and he tasked his general Wang Zhongsi (王忠嗣) to arrest Özmiş.

Wang Zhongsi organized a coalition of two Turkic people Uighur and Karluk to assist Shi and his Basmyl Army. Shi's coalition defeated Özmiş Khagan and Pan Kul. Although Özmiş escaped he was soon defeated for the second time and was killed along with Pan Kol in 744 by Ashina Shi himself.

== Death ==
However, Tang China's Emperor believed his realm was in danger "As long as an Ashina Khagan was alive.", an anti-Turkic coalition formed by Uyghurs and Karluks, Shi was defeated and killed in a battle against the same coalition he once led. His death marked the end of Second Turkic Khaganate and the beginning of Uyghur Khaganate.
