= Tonyukuk =

Military commander of the Second Turkic Khaganate

Tarkhan of the Second Turkic Khaganate
- Reign: 681–716 or 717
- Full name: Bilge Tuñuquq Boyla Baga Tarkan
- Native name: 𐰋𐰃𐰠𐰏𐰀 𐱃𐰆𐰪𐰸𐰸 𐰉𐰆𐰖𐰞𐰀 𐰉𐰍𐰀 𐱃𐰺𐰴𐰣 (in Old Turkic)
- Other titles: Apa Tarkan
- Born: Ashide Yuanzhen 阿史德元珍 c. 646; Yulin, Tang dynasty (modern day Inner Mongolia)
- Died: c. 726 (aged 79–80)
- Noble family: Ashide
- Issue: Po Beg
- Occupation: Counsellor; Grand vizier Commander-in-chief
- Memorials: Tonyukuk inscriptions

Tonyukuk (Old Turkic: 𐰋𐰃𐰠𐰏𐰀:𐱃𐰆𐰪𐰸𐰸, romanized: Bilgä Tuňuquq, lit. 'Tunyuquq the Wise', Chinese: 暾欲谷; pinyin: Tunyugu, born c. 646, died c. 726) was the baga-tarkhan (supreme commander) and adviser of four successive Göktürk khagans – Ilterish Qaghan, Qapaghan Qaghan, Inel Qaghan and Bilge Qaghan. He conducted victorious campaigns against various Turkic and non-Turkic steppe peoples, such as the Tölis, Xueyantuo, Toquz Oguz, Yenisei Kyrgyz, Kurykans, Thirty Tatar, Khitan and Tatabi as well as the Tang dynasty. He was described as a kingmaker by historians such as E. P. Thompson and Peter Benjamin Golden.

== Name ==
The name is spelled as t_{1}-o-ɲ-uq_{1}-uq_{1} (𐱃𐰆𐰪𐰸𐰸) in the Old Turkic script, variously interpreted as Tunuquq, Tonuquq, Tuj-uquq, Toɲ Yuguq, Tujun-oq, Tojuquq, Tuɲoqoq with a number of suggestions for its etymology. According to Sertkaya, Tunuk means "clear, pure, abyss, who reached the depth" or "pure, penetrative", and uq or oq means "idea, wise, well-informed". Thus, Tonuquq is the owner of deep and pure idea. His title "Bilge" means wise or master in Old Turkic. René M. Giraud read the name as tonïuquq, from ton "dress, clothes" with I possessive and yuquq (from the verb yuk- "to stick") and meaning "whose dress is blessed with oil"; Likewise, Jean-Paul Roux explained the name as "with oiled dress" while discussing the culinary culture of the Mongols and suggesting that they had dirty and stained clothes.

== Life ==
=== Early years ===
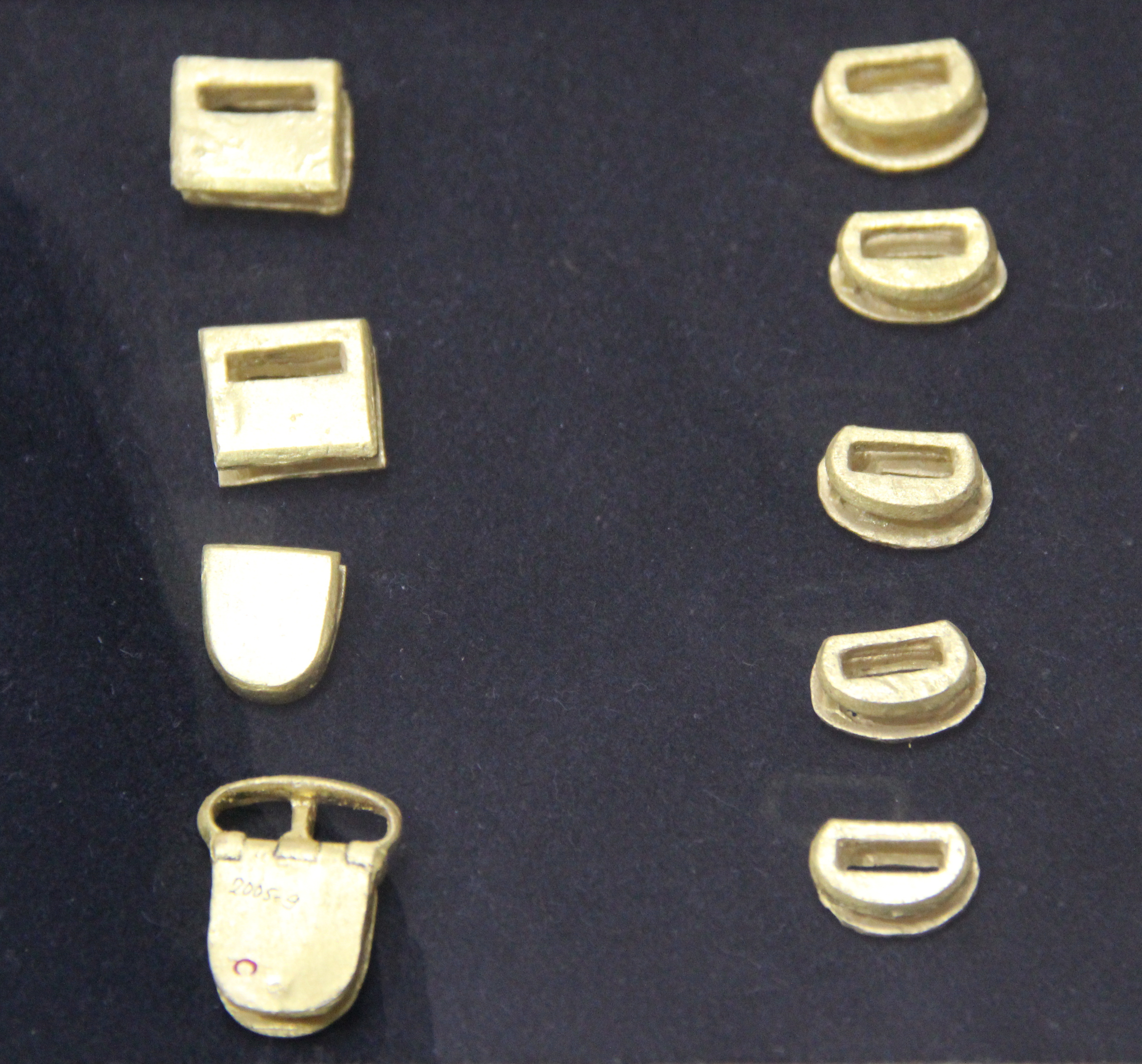
Gold belt ornaments, Tonyukuk ritual place, Tov, Erdene.

Tonyukuk was born around 646, near Tuul River in the land of the Ashide tribe. He fled the Tang dynasty in 679 and joined Ilterish Qaghan in 681.

𐰋𐰃𐰠𐰏𐰀 𐱃𐰆𐰪𐰸𐰸 𐰋𐰤 𐰇𐰕𐰢 𐱃𐰉𐰍𐰲 𐰃𐰠𐰭𐰀 𐰶𐰠𐰦𐰢 𐱅𐰇𐰼𐰚 𐰉𐰆𐰑𐰣 𐱃𐰉𐰍𐰲𐰴𐰀 𐰝𐰇𐰼𐰼 𐰼𐱅𐰃
Bilge Toñuquq bän özüm Tabγač eliŋä qılıntım Türk bodun Tabγačqa körür ärti.
I myself, wise Tonyukuk, born in Tabgach [i.e. Tang China] country. (As the whole) Turk people was under Chinese subjection.

=== During Ilterish Qaghan's reign ===
Although he lost early wars against Xue Rengui, he was a formidable force in establishing the Second Turkic Khaganate. In 687, the Tang invaded Göktürk land again. Empress Dowager Wu commissioned the ethnically Baekje general Heichi Changzhi, assisted by Li Duozuo, to defend against Turkic attack and were able to defeat the Turkic forces at Huanghuadui (modern day Shuozhou, Shanxi) causing the Turkic forces to flee.

=== During Qapaghan Qaghan's reign ===
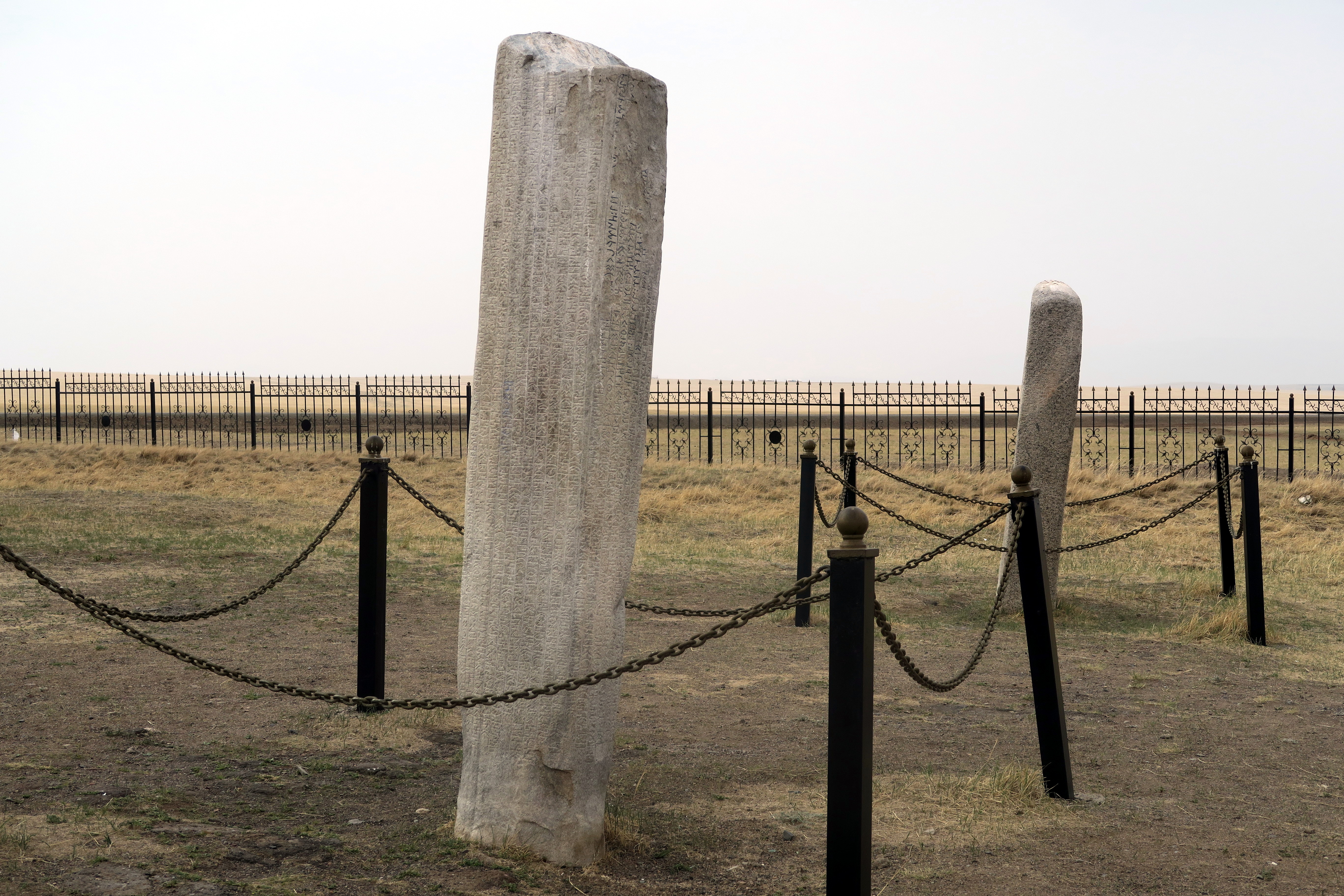
The Tonyukuk inscriptions.

In 703, he was sent by Qapaghan Qaghan for a marriage proposal to the Wu Zhou dynasty. Wu Zetian accepted the proposal, in exchange Wu Yanxiu was released on the Khagan's order. However, Emperor Zhongzhong's accession changed the political climate, causing the cancellation of the marriage.

In 712, he commanded a Turkic army during Battle of Bolchu which proved disastrous for the Turgesh army.

=== During Inel Qaghan's reign ===
He was not in active politics during Inel Qaghan's reign and accepted him as a legitimate ruler. Although this did not cost him his life and was spared, perhaps because of his great authority and his age. Another reason would the fact that he was Bilge Qaghan's father-in-law.

=== During Bilge Qaghan's reign ===
In 716 he was appointed as master strategist (bagha tarkhan) by his son-in-law Bilge Qaghan.

Chinese sources state that Bilge Qaghan wanted to convert to Buddhism and establish cities and temples. However, Tonyukuk discouraged him from this by pointing out that their nomadic lifestyle was what made them a greater military power when compared to the Tang dynasty. While the Turks' power rested on their mobility, conversion to Buddhism would bring pacifism among population. Therefore sticking to Tengriism was necessary to survive.

In 720 the Tang chancellor Wang Jun proposed a plan to attack Bilge Qaghan' along with the Baximi, Xi, and Khitan. Emperor Xuanzong also recruited Qapaghan Qaghan's sons Bilgä Tegin and Mo Tegin, Yenisei Kyrgyz Qaγan Qutluğ Bilgä Qaγan and Huoba Guiren to fight against the Turks. Tonyukuk launched a first attack on Baximi in the autumn of 721, completely crushing them. Meanwhile Bilge raided Gansu, taking much of the livestock. Later that year the Khitans, the next year the Xi were crushed.

He died around 726.

== Family ==
He was father to Qutluğ Säbäg Qatun and a father-in-law of Bilge Qaghan', thus a grandfather to Yollıg Khagan and Tengri Qaghan.

== Legacy ==
His biography, achievements and advice for state administration were carved in Old Turkic script on two stele erected around 716 (before his death) at a site known as Bayn Tsokto, in Ulaanbaatar's Nalaikh district. Yuan era Uyghur official Xie Wenzhi (楔文質), as well as Korean Gyeongju Seol clan claimed descent from Tonyukuk.

He was mentioned and remembered in some Uyghur Manichaean texts later in Qocho.

The Berlin Manichaean manuscript found in Qocho read as follows:

Then the wise Toñuk(uk) spoke as follows: The Turk (nation) is ruined and has lost its chance of (salvation).

== Relationship to Ashide Yuanzhen ==
Friedrich Hirth proposed that Tonyukuk and another Turkic general, Ashide Yuanzhen, were the same person. According to Chinese sources, Yuanzhen was a defector who originally led surrendered Turks under the Chanyu Protectorate before he was arrested for criminal affairs. He defected to Ilterish Qaghan when he came plundering and was put in charge of military affairs. Yuanzhen participated in many of Ilterish's campaigns until he died while campaigning against the Turgesh.

According to Hirth, the information contained in Chinese sources on Yuanzhen's death is not trustworthy and speculated that Yuanzhen had fabricated his death and lived under a new name, Tonyukuk. Following up on this hypothesis, A. U. Elöve proposed that toñukuk was composed of ton and yokuk, which combined means "the highest person" in Old Turkic. According to Klyashtorny, the element yuquq means "hidden, protected thing, value, treasure, jewelry", which is derived from the verb "yoq/yuq" meaning "to hide, to protect" (used in Uyghur legal documents); meanwhile, the other ton means "first"; thus his Chinese name 元珍 Yuánzhēn is a calque of his Turkic name Tonyuquq, both meaning "first treasure"

The theory is opposed by Chen Hao, who points out that Yuanzhen already received his Chinese name prior to joining Ilterish while Tonyukuk was a title that must have been bestowed after his defection, thus making the link between the two names anachronistic. Yuanzhen was a common Chinese style name for descendants of Turks in the Tang dynasty. Other Turkic Chinese names also followed a similar pattern such as Yuanqing and Yuanchong.

According to the Zizhi Tongjian, Apa Tarkan (Yuanzhen's title) convinced Qapaghan Qaghan not to kill the Chinese diplomats in 697. This info was used by Klyashtorny as evidence that Yuanzhen survived the Turgesh campaign. However, Chen argues that this information in the Zizhi Tongjian was copied from the Chaoye qianzai, which is a collection of folk tales and fantasy stories that are not very reliable. It also contradicts Hirth's theory that Yuanzhen faked his death and thereafter went by Tonyukuk.

== In popular culture ==
- Portrayed by Kim Seong-hun in the 2006-2007 KBS TV series Dae Jo-yeong.

== Bibliography ==
- Chen, Hao (2021), A History of the Second Türk Empire (ca. 682–745 AD), Brill.
- E. Denison Ross, The Tonyukuk Inscription, Being a Translation of Professor Vilhelm Thomsen's final Danish Rendering, Bulletin of the School of Oriental Studies, University of London, 1930.
- Nathan Light. An 8th Century Turkic Narrative: Pragmatics, Reported Speech and Managing Information. Turkic languages. 10.2, 2006. pp 155–186.
