= Battle of Bolchu =

Battle between the Kutluk and Turgesh Khaganates (Gokturks)

Date	711
Location	Close to Urungu River, (now in Xinjiang, China)
Result	Second Turkic Khaganate victory

Belligerents
Second Turkic Khaganate	Türgesh; Toquz Oghuz; Tang dynasty

Commanders and leaders
Tonyukuk; Kul Tigin; Bilge Qaghan	Saqal †

Strength
20,000	100,000 20,000+ Tang soldiers.

The Battle of Bolchu was fought in 711 between the Second Turkic Khaganate and the Türgesh.

== Background ==
In the 7th century, the First Turkic Khaganate was divided into two rival states. Both states were subsequently defeated and annexed by the Tang dynasty. However, both sections of the empire soon gained their independence. The eastern part was called Second Turkic Khaganate and the western part Türgesh (or more loosely Onoq, the ten tribes which were dominated by the Türgesh). According to old Turkic tradition, the eastern sections were considered to be the main khaganate and the western sections were considered to be vassals of the eastern section. Thus Türgesh leaders were apprehensive of the Second Turkic Khaganate and sought alliances (like Yenisei Kirghiz and Tang dynasty) against their growing power.

== Early moves ==
The Türgesh khagan Saqal had given his brother Zhenu ülüş (fief). His brother however asked for more and fled to the Second Turkic Khaganate. Qapaghan Qaghan, the ruler of the Second Turkic Khaganate was fighting in the east against the Khitan people and Saqal saw this as a good time to strike. The army of the Türgesh and their allies was large. According to the Tonyukuk inscriptions its manpower was about 100,000. This figure was probably exaggerated, but it was certainly more powerful than the Qapaghan's army of 20,000. Moreover, the khatun (queen) was dead and Qapaghan was busy with the funeral. He appointed Tonyukuk, his chancellor, as the commander. Qapaghan’s son Inel, as well as his nephews Bilge (both future qaghans) and Kul Tigin, were with Tonyukuk. According to historian Lev Gumilev, Qapaghan was not sure about the victory and Tonyukuk was given orders for attrition warfare.

== Battle ==
The vanguard units of the Tonyukuk’s army won a minor victory against Türgesh vanguard units. But this victory demoralized the commanders in the Tonyukuk army who learned about the strength of the Türgesh army. Tonyukuk however was determined and attacked the Türgesh army. The final clash was in Dzungaria, close to the Bolchu River (the Bolchu River was probably the former name of the Ulungur River, Xinjiang, China). After two days' fighting Tonyukuk defeated the Türgesh army. Both Saqal and Zhenu were executed. The other leaders of Onoq paid obedience and all western Turkestan came under the Second Turkic Khaganate. According to the Tonyukuk inscriptions, Temir Kapig in Transoxiana (now in Uzbekistan) was also captured.

== Aftermath ==
Although Qapaghan was able to unite all the territory of the first Turkic Khaganate under his rule, Turkic rule in Transoxania was short. It was soon checked by the Arabs who were also conquering Transoxania from the south. Although Kul Tigin was able to save the Turkic army, Turkic hegemony diminished and the Türgesh (now under Suluk) regained strength. In later years it was Suluk who fought against the invading Arabs.

== Sources ==
- Gumilev, Lev Nikolayeviç (2002). Eski Türkler. İstanbul: Selenge. ISBN 975-7856-39-8.
- Klyashtorny, S.G; Sultanov, T.İ (2003). Türkün Üçbin Yılı. İstanbul: Selenge. ISBN 975-8839-03-9.
- Elgin, Muharrem (1980). Orhun Abideleri. İstanbul: Boğaziçi.
- Taşağıl, Ahmet (2012). Göktürkler. Ankara: AKDTYK. ISBN 978-975-16-2460-4.
