= Kulun Beg =

Gokturk ruler

Qaghan of the Second Turkic Khaganate
- Reign: 744 – 745
- Predecessor: Özmiş Khagan
- Successor: Position abolished
- Born: Ashina Gulongfu 阿史那鹘陇匐
- Died: 745
- House: Ashina
- Father: Özmiş Khagan

Kulun Beg (Chinese: 白眉可汗; pinyin: Báiméi Kèhán) was a Göktürk ruler who tried in vain to sustain the Second Turkic Khaganate.

== Family ==
Kulun Beg succeeded Özmiş Khagan who had been beheaded by Ashina Shi. His relation to Özmiş Khagan is unclear. According to Taşağıl he was Özmiş Khagan's son and according to the family tree drawn by Lev Gumilev he was Özmiş Khagan's brother.

== Reign ==
He was enthroned in 744 at a time when the Central Asian steppes were already conquered by the coalition of Uighurs, Basmyl and Karluks. Chinese emperor Xuanzong decided to destroy the last traces of the Turkic Khaganate and sent general Wang Zhongsi (王忠嗣) over to Kulun Beg’s forces. Meanwhile Ashina Shi was deposed by Kutlug I Bilge Khagan of the Uyghur Khaganate. Wang Zhongsi defeated the eastern flank of Turkic army headed by Apa Tarkhan. Although Kulun Beg tried to escape, he was arrested by the Uighurs and was beheaded in 745.

Kulun Beg Ashina Clan
Preceded by Özmiş Khagan	Khagan of the Second Turkic Khaganate; 744–745	Succeeded by (end of the empire)
