= Kutluk Yabgu Khagan =

- Claimant to be Khagan of the Second Turkic Khaganate
- As regent, then khagan: 741–742
- Predecessor: Tengri Khagan
- Successor: Ashina Shi (Basmyl chief); Özmiş Khagan (claimant)
- Born: Kutluk Yabgu 骨咄葉護
- Died: 742
- Religion: Tengrism

Kutluk Yabgu Khagan (Chinese: 骨咄葉護; pinyin: Gǔduō Yèhù) was one of the last yabghus (rulers) of the Second Turkic Khaganate.

== Background ==
Kutluk Yabgu Khagan was not a descendant of the former khagan. He was a yabgu (high officer) in the Second Turkic Khaganate. Tengri Khagan was killed by Pan Kül Tigin, one of his shads (governors). However, Pan Kül Tigin was defeated by Basmyls, a Turkic tribe.

== Reign and downfall ==
During the interregnum after Pan Kül Tigin's death, Kutluk Yabgu, enthroned a son of Bilge Khagan as the new khagan, but he soon changed sides and declared himself khagan in 741.

In 742, the Tang emperor Xuanzong organized a secret alliance within the Turkic Khaganate. Basmyls, Uighurs and Karluks, the three Turkic tribes attacked capital. Kutluk Yabgu was killed. He was succeeded by Özmiş Khagan by some Turkic nobles. Meanwhile, Basmyl chief Ashina Shi also declared himself khagan.

Kutluk Yabgu Khagan
Preceded by Tengri Khagan	Khagan of the Second Turkic Khaganate; 741–742	Succeeded by Ashina Shi (Basmyl chief); Özmiş Khagan (claimant)
