= Ashina Funian =

Göktürk claimant

Ashina Funian (Chinese: 阿史那伏念; r. 680–681) was a Göktürk leader and member of the Ashina tribe who was the leader of a Göktürk revolt in the 7th century that tried to restore the Eastern Turkic Khaganate and break from Tang domination. His rebellion was unsuccessful and he was executed by Tang authorities in 681.

== Background ==
Towards the end of the sixth century, the Turkic Khaganate, which had recently succeeded the Rouran Khaganate as the hegemonic power of the Mongolian Plateau was involved in a civil war and by 603 it had separated into two independent states; the Eastern Turkic Khaganate and the Western Turkic Khaganate. The Eastern Khaganate was conquered by the Chinese Tang dynasty in 630, and the Western Khaganate was conquered by the Tang dynasty in 657. After their conquest, the Eastern Turks were forced to accept a protectorate status on China's outskirts. They were confined to live in the Ordos Loop and in 639, after an Ashina attempted to assassinate Emperor Taizong of Tang, they were forced to live between the Yellow River and Gobi Desert, as a buffer state between China and the Xueyantuo.

A rebellion attempt was started by Chebi Khan in 646, who tried to reestablish the Khaganate before being captured by Tang general Gao Kan in 650. A second attempt took place between 679 and 680, when Ashina Nishufu, a descendant of the leading Ashina tribe, led a series of successful campaigns against China, now ruled by Empress Wu, before being defeated by a large Chinese army under the command of general Pei Xingjian. Nishufu was later killed by his own men.

== Rebellion ==
Following Nishufu's death, Ashina Funian, another member of the royal clan and a son of Illig Qaghan's paternal cousin, was made qaghan by Bengü from the Ashide clan and the Eastern Turks once again rebelled against the Tang.

The early stages of the rebellion brought about some victories for Funian. In one of the first battles, Funian defeated the Tang general Cao Huaishun and showed mercy towards him and his army, granting them free passage in exchange for valuables, with the two leaders even sacrificing an ox in order to seal a peace pact. These impromptu diplomatic efforts on behalf of Cao were not well received by the Tang authorities, who refused to honour his agreement and punished Cao with exile.

In 681, the Eastern Turks were once again defeated by Pei Xiangjin, who had played on the distrust between different rebel factions. Pei convinced Ashina Funian to surrender, with the promise that he would not suffer consequences for his rebellion if he captured Ashide Bengü, the provocateur of the rebellion, for the Tang. Once he and other rebels surrendered in Chang'an, Funian became the center of court intrigue, with the powerful Chief Minister Pei Yan, a political adversary of Pei Xingjian, calling for the execution of Funian and other leaders of the Turkic rebellion.

On 5 December 681, Ashina Funian and 53 other Göktürks were publicly executed in Chang'an. This execution, as well as the fact that it came about as a result of court politics, further fueled anti-Chinese sentiments among Eastern Turks.

== Aftermath ==
Funian's death proved to be only a temporary respite for the rebelling Göktürk who, in 682, elected the chieftain Ashina Qutlugh as their next qaghan, under the name Ilterish Qaghan. Ilterish gathered Funian's troops, united the tribes, defeated Tang China and gained independence, founding the Second Turkic Khaganate.
