= Yulin, Inner Mongolia =

Yulin 榆林镇 ᠢᠦᠢ ᠯᠢᠨ
- Town
- Location in Inner Mongolia
- Coordinates: 40°52′38″N 112°1′55″E
- Country: People's Republic of China
- Autonomous region: Inner Mongolia
- Prefecture-level city: Hohhot
- District: Saihan District
- Time zone: UTC+8 (China Standard)

Yulin (Chinese: 榆林; pinyin: Yúlín) Yui lin (Mongolian: ᠢᠦᠢ
ᠯᠢᠨ }; Юй лин) is a town under the administration of Saihan District, Hohhot, Inner Mongolia, China. As of 2018, it has one residential community and 21 villages under its administration.
