= Qapaghan Qaghan =

Second Qaghan of the Second Turkic Khaganate

- Chanyu

Qaghan of the Second Turkic Khaganate
- Reign: 692 – 716
- Predecessor: Ilterish Qaghan
- Successor: Inel Qaghan
- Born: Ashina Mochuo 阿史那默啜; 664
- Died: July 22, 716 (aged 51–52); Manchuria
- Issue: Ilterish Qaghan (brother); Ashina Duoxifu (brother); Inel Khagan (son)
- House: Ashina
- Father: Etmish Beg
- Religion: Tengrism

Qapaghan or Qapghan Qaghan (Old Turkic: 𐰴𐰯𐰍𐰣:𐰴𐰍𐰣, romanized: Qapaɣan qaɣan, lit. meaning "the conqueror", simplified Chinese: 迁善; traditional Chinese: 遷善; pinyin: Qiānshàn, Xiao'erjing: ٿِيًا شًا, Dungan: Чяншан, Chinese: 阿史那•默啜; pinyin: Āshǐnà Mòchuò, also called Bögü Qaghan (Old Turkic: 𐰋𐰇𐰏:𐰴𐰍𐰣, romanized: Bögü qaɣan) in the Tonyukuk inscriptions) was the second qaghan of the Second Turkic Khaganate and was the younger brother of the first qaghan, Ilterish Qaghan. His reign (691–716) marked the apogee of the military and political might of the Second Turkic Khaganate and the beginning of its decline.

== Name ==
His personal name Mochuo is a Chinese transcription of his Turkic name Bögü-Çor, with Old Turkic: 𐰋𐰇𐰏, romanized: Bögü meaning "wise". The same name occurs in the Sogdian version of the Karabalsagun inscription (821 AD). He used the name Bögü Chor Shad during Ilterish's reign. His regnal name Qapaghan comes from the Old Turkic verb "kap-" meaning "to conquer".

== Biography ==
=== Early years ===
Qapaghan was born around 664. In 681, he assisted his brother, Ilterish Qaghan, in a revolt against Tang dominion, and succeeded in reviving the Eastern Turkic Khaganate.

In 689, he led a raid to frontier areas. In response, Empress Wu sent Huaiyi to fortify. He advanced to Zi River (紫河, a tributary of the Yellow River) but did not encounter Turkic forces. He erected a monument at Chanyu Tower (單于臺, in modern Hohhot, Inner Mongolia) before withdrawing.

=== Reign ===
In 692, Qapaghan succeeded his brother as qaghan. His succession was seen as usurpation in China.

Between 693 and 706 Qapaghan’s army forced a crossing of the Yellow River six times and made deep inroads into northern China against which the Chinese forces could offer no effective resistance. Empress Wu paid vast indemnities to Qapaghan and sent him gifts which were in effect thinly disguised tributes.

In 694, Qapaghan attacked Ling Prefecture (roughly modern Yinchuan, Ningxia), and Wu Zetian commissioned Huaiyi, assisted by the chancellors Li Zhaode and Su Weidao, to defend against Qapaghan's attack, but before the army could set out, Qapaghan withdrew.

In the summer of 696, the Khitan chieftains Li Jinzhong and Sun Wanrong, brothers-in-law, angry over the mistreatment of the Khitan people by the Zhou official Zhao Wenhui (趙文翽), the prefect of Ying Prefecture (Chinese: 營州, roughly Chaoyang County, Liaoning), rebelled, with Li assuming the title of Wushang Khan. Armies that Wu Zetian sent to suppress Li and Sun's rebellion were defeated by Khitan forces, which in turn attacked Zhou proper.

Meanwhile, Qapaghan Qaghan offered help but was also launching attacks against Zhou and the Khitan—including an attack against the Khitan base of operations during the winter of 696, shortly after Li's death, that captured Li and Sun's families and temporarily halted Khitan operations against Zhou. Sun, after taking over as khan and reorganizing Khitan forces, again attacked Zhou territory and had many victories over Zhou forces, including a battle during which Wang Shijie was killed. Wu Zetian tried to allay the situation by making peace with Qapaghan at fairly costly terms—the return of Turkic people who had previously submitted to Zhou and providing Turks with seeds, silk, tools, and iron. In the summer of 697, Qapaghan launched another attack on the Khitan's base of operations, after his attack, the Khitan forces collapsed and Sun was killed in flight, ending the Khitan threat. Empress Wu gave him the title Ilterish Da Chanyu (頡跌利施大單于), Ligong Baoguo (立功報國), Generalissimo of the Left Guards (左衛大將軍) as well as Duke of Guiguo (歸國) and Qianshan Khagan (迁善可汗), literally meaning "Good moving khagan" in 695.

In winter, after securing the Chinese border, he turned his attention to further northward expansion, notably subjugating Yenisei Kyrgyz and killing their khagan. While preparing an attack on Türgesh forces, his khatun died, so the invasion was called off.

In 698, Qapaghan demanded a Tang dynasty prince for marriage to his daughter, part of a plot to join his family with the Tang, displace the Zhou, and restore Tang rule over China under his influence. When Wu Zetian sent her grandnephew Wu Yanxiu (武延秀), to marry Qapaghan's daughter instead. Zhang Jianzhi opposed, stating, "In ancient times, no Chinese imperial prince had ever married a barbarian woman as his wife." This opposition drew displeasure from Wu Zetian, as she wanted peace with the Turks, and demoted Zhang to be the prefect of He Prefecture (合州, modern northern Chongqing). Qapaghan nevertheless rejected the prince. He had no intention to cement the peace treaty with a marriage; instead, when Wu Yanxiu arrived, he detained Wu Yanxiu and then launched a major attack on Zhou, advancing as far south as Zhao Prefecture (趙州, in modern Shijiazhuang, Hebei). He made Chinese general Yan Zhiwei (阎知微) the Southern Khagan (南面可汗) and persuaded him to help invade cities of Zhaozhou and Dingzhou. Zhou general Murong Xuanjiao (慕容玄皦) also submitted to Qapaghan with 5,000 soldiers.

In August 698, Qapaghan attacked Dingzhou, captured and killed its governor Sun Yangao (孙彦高), and burned the city. Wu Zetian issued a proclamation that if anyone killed Qapaghan they would be granted title prince. She subsequently renamed him Zhanchuo (斩啜, meaning "chopped head") as a play on his name Mochuo.

In September, Zhaozhou was also attacked, Deputy Governor Tang Boruo (唐波若) handed over the keys and governor Gao Rui (高睿) was immediately executed.

In October, Qapaghan let Yan Zhiwei go back to China, who was captured and executed on charges of treason.

In 712, the Arab general Qutayba ibn Muslim besieged Samarkand after capturing Khwarazm. The prince of Samarkand appealed to Qapaghan for aid. Qapaghan, who had become overlord of both Tashkent and Ferghana, dispatched Kul Tigin at the head of a combined army of Eastern Turks, Tashkent forces, and Ferghana troops to relieve the besieged city. Despite the strength of the Turkic forces, Qutayba ultimately defeated Kul Tigin's army, forcing the Turks to withdraw and allowing the Umayyads to enter Samarkand and establish a garrison there.

=== Reforms ===
In 699, he appointed his younger brother Ashina Duoxifu as the governor of the eastern wing (Tölös Shad) and his nephew Ashina Mojilian as governor of western wing with each of them commanding 20,000 men, he also put his son Bögü as their overseer and made him a lesser qaghan. He was also given command of Onoq with 40,000 men.

=== Later reign ===
In 703, he sent Tonyukuk for another marriage proposal. Wu Zetian accepted the proposal; in exchange, Wu Yanxiu was released on Qapaghan's order. However, Emperor Zhongzong of Tang's accession changed the political climate.

In 705, Turkic forces commanded by Mojilian entered Lingwu, defeating Shazha Chongyi (沙吒忠义), who was then dismissed from service. In response, Zhongzhong declined marriage proposal and proclaimed prize for anyone willing to kill Qapaghan.

In 711, Qapaghan sent a marriage proposal to Ruizong, this time intending to marry a Tang princess. Emperor Ruizong accepted and made a daughter of Li Chengqi, Princess Jinshan (金山公主). Qapaghan sent his son Ashina Yangwozhi (阿史那楊我支) to Chang'an. However, the decision was soon reversed by the newly enthroned Xuanzong.

Later that year Türgesh forces were crushed by Tonyukuk at the Battle of Bolchu. Certain Bars Beg (or probably Suluk) was appointed chief of the Türgesh and married Mojilian's daughter. In 713, the Karluks were defeated by combined forces of Kapaghan, Mojilian and Kul Tegin.

In 714, February Bögü, Tonga Tegin and Qapaghan's brother-in-law Huoba Elteber Ashibi attacked Beiting, during the siege Tonga Tegin was killed, while Ashibi fled to the Tang, where he was renamed Huoba Guiren (火拔歸仁) and made a general.

In 715, due to his cruelty, some of his men and a number of tribes, including his Korean son-in-law Gao Wenjian (高文簡) and Ashide son-in-law Ashide Hulu (阿史德胡禄) submitted to the Tang. Rebellions of tribes followed.

=== Death ===
Qapaghan was on his way back from suppressing the revolting Tiele tribes of Uyghurs, Tongluo, Baixi, Bayegu and Xueyantuo, was ambushed killed by a Bayegu tribesman named Xiezhilue (颉质略) on 22 July 716 while passing through a forest. His severed head was sent to Chang'an.

== Family ==
According to Cuisenier, he married El Bilga Khatun, a widow of his brother. He had a number of issues:

- Inel Khagan
- Tonga Tegin (d. 713, Beiting)
- Mo Tegin (Left Wise Prince)
- Bilge Tegin (Right Wise Prince)
- Ashina Yangwozhi (阿史那楊我支) (d. 715)
- Kuchluk Bilge Khatun (698–723) was married to Ashide Hulu (阿史德胡禄)
- Unnamed daughter was married to Gao Wenjian (高文簡)

== In popular culture ==
- Portrayed by Kang Jae-ik in the 2006-2007 KBS TV series Dae Jo-yeong.

== See also ==
- Kavhan

Qapaghan Qaghan Ashina Clan
Preceded by Ilterish Qaghan	Qaghan of the Second Turkic Khaganate; 694–716	Succeeded by Inel Qaghan
