= Orkhon inscriptions =

Göktürk inscriptions dating to the 8th century

- Old Turkic: 𐰏𐱃𐱁𐰋𐰃𐱅, romanized: bitig taš, lit. 'A stone where the old Turkic inscription was carved.' simplified Chinese: 阙特勤碑; traditional Chinese: 闕特勤碑; pinyin: Què tèqín bēi ('Queteqin Monument')
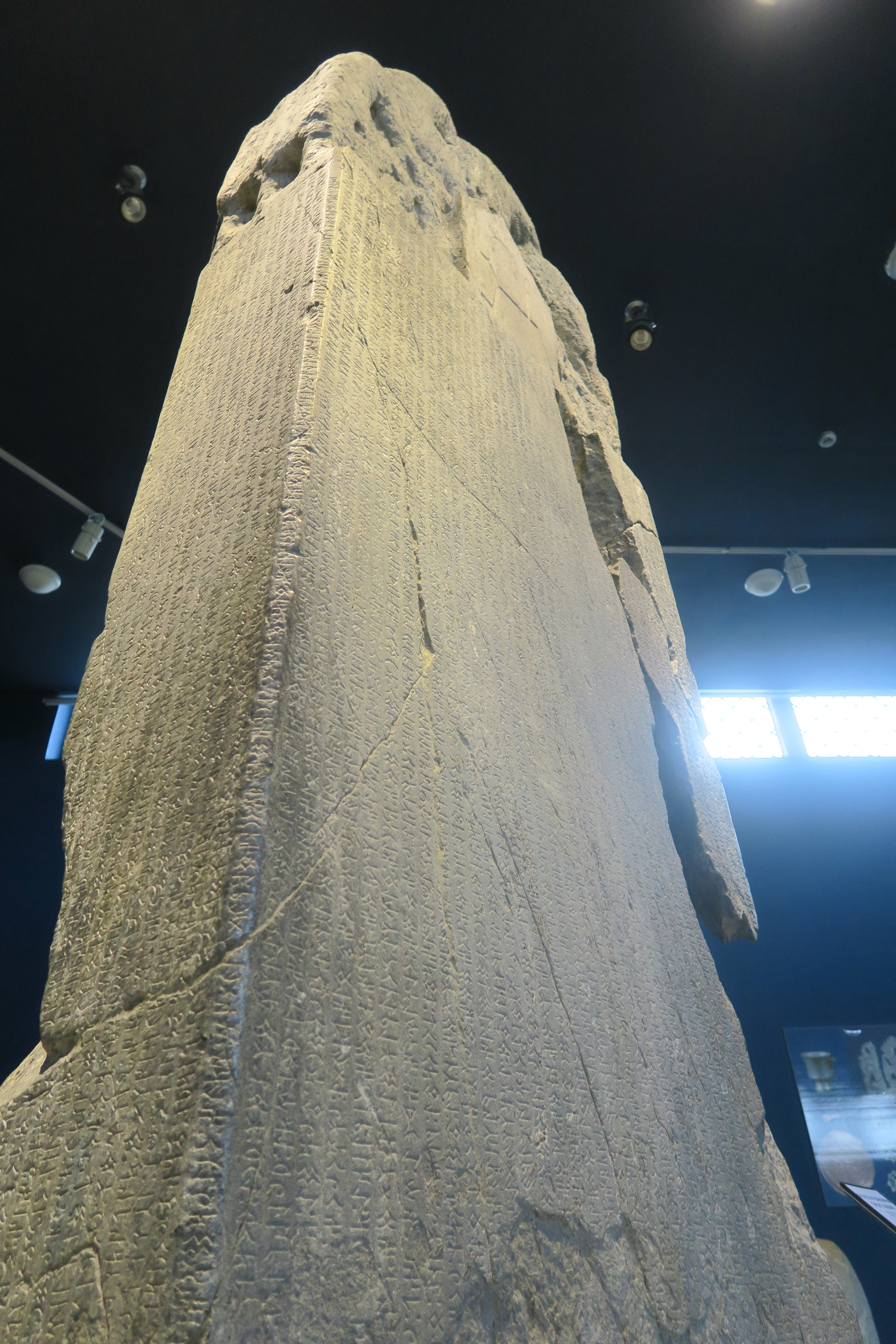
- The Kul Tigin stele at Göktürk Museum, Khashaat, Mongolia
- Type: Memorial
- Height: 3.3 metres (11 ft)
- Width: 1.3 metres (4 ft 3 in)
- Writing: Middle Chinese; Old Turkic, written in Old Turkic alphabet
- Created: 8th century
- Discovered: 1889; Orkhon Valley, Mongolia; 47°33′38″N 102°50′28″E
- Discovered by: Nikolai Yadrintsev
- Present location: Bilge Khan and General Kul Tigin Complex

The Orkhon inscriptions are bilingual texts in Middle Chinese and Old Turkic, the latter written in the Old Turkic alphabet, carved into two memorial steles erected in the early 8th century by the Göktürks in the Orkhon Valley in what is modern-day Mongolia. They were created in honor of two Turkic princes, Kul Tigin and his brother Bilge Qaghan.

The inscriptions relate in both languages the legendary origins of the Turks, the golden age of their history, their subjugation by the Tang dynasty, and their liberation by Ilterish Qaghan. According to one source, the inscriptions contain "rhythmic and parallelistic passages" which resemble that of epics.

== Name ==
Orkhon can also be transcribed as Orhun. Orkhon valley is where monuments were found and named after. They are also called Kul Tigin steles and Bilge Qaghan inscriptions.

Inscriptions together also known as the Khöshöö Tsaidam Turkic memorial complex (also spelled Kocho-Tsaidam, Khoshoo Tsaidam, Koshu-Tsaidam or Höshöö Caidam), which comes from Khoshoo Tsaidam archaeological site where the monuments were found.

Kul Tigin (684–731; simplified Chinese: 阙特勤; traditional Chinese: 闕特勤; pinyin: Què tèqín) is one of the two brothers to whom the monument was dedicated.

== Discovery and translation ==
The inscriptions were discovered by Nikolai Yadrintsev's expedition in 1889, published by Vasily Radlov. The original text was written in the Old Turkic alphabet and was deciphered by the Danish philologist Vilhelm Thomsen in 1893. Thomsen first published the translation in French in 1899, and then a more complete interpretation in Danish in 1922.

=== Region ===
The Orkhon Valley is a region on the western Orkhon River in modern-day Mongolia, near Ögii Lake. More specifically, they stand about 80 km (50 mi) north of the Erdene Zuu Monastery, and approximately 40 km (25 mi) northwest of the Ordu-Baliq.

=== Importance ===
Before the Orkhon inscriptions were deciphered by Vilhelm Thomsen, very little was known about Turkic script. The scripts are the oldest form of a Turkic language to be preserved. When the Orkhon inscriptions were first discovered, it was obvious that they were a runic type of script that had been discovered at other sites, but these versions also had a clear form, similar to an alphabet. When Vilhelm Thomsen deciphered the inscriptions it was a huge stepping stone in understanding Old Turkic script, providing much of the foundation for translating other Turkic writings.

The script follows an alphabetical form, but also appears to have strong influences of rune carvings. The inscriptions are a great example of early signs of nomadic society's transitions from use of runes to a uniform alphabet, and the Orkhon alphabet is thought to have been derived from or inspired by a non-cursive version of the Sogdian script.

== Historical context ==
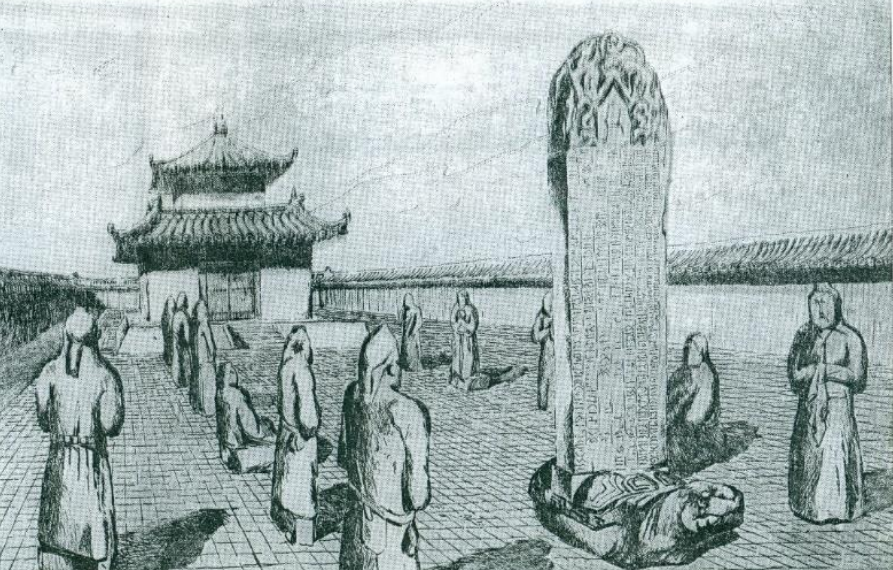
Reconstruction of Kül Tigin's memorial (after Nowgorodova 1981)

The steles were erected by the Göktürks in the early 8th century. They commemorate the brothers Bilge Qaghan (683–734) and Kul Tigin (684–731), one a politician and the other a military commander. Both were descendants of Ilterish Qaghan of the Second Turkic Khaganate, which was a prominent Turkic nomadic society during the Tang dynasty.

Location of the Orkhon Valley in Asia

The Göktürks have left artifacts and installations all over their realm, from Manchuria to the Black Sea, but only in modern-day Mongolia have any memorials to kings and other aristocrats been found. The ones in Khöshöö Tsaidam consist of tablets with inscriptions in Chinese and Old Turkic characters. Both monuments are stone slabs originally erected on carved stone turtles within walled enclosures. Bilge Qaghan's stone shows a carved ibex (the emblem of Göktürk qaghans) and a twisted dragon. In both enclosings, evidence of altars and carved depictions of human couples were found, possibly depicting the respective honorary and his spouse.

The Old Turkic inscriptions on these monuments were written by Yollıg Tigin, a son of Bilge Qaghan. These inscriptions, together with the Tonyukuk inscriptions, are the oldest extant attestation of that language. The inscriptions show the sacred importance of the region, as evidenced by the statement, "If you stay in the land of the Ötüken, and send caravans from there, you will have no trouble. If you stay at the Ötüken Mountains, you will live forever dominating the tribes!".

== Content of the inscriptions ==
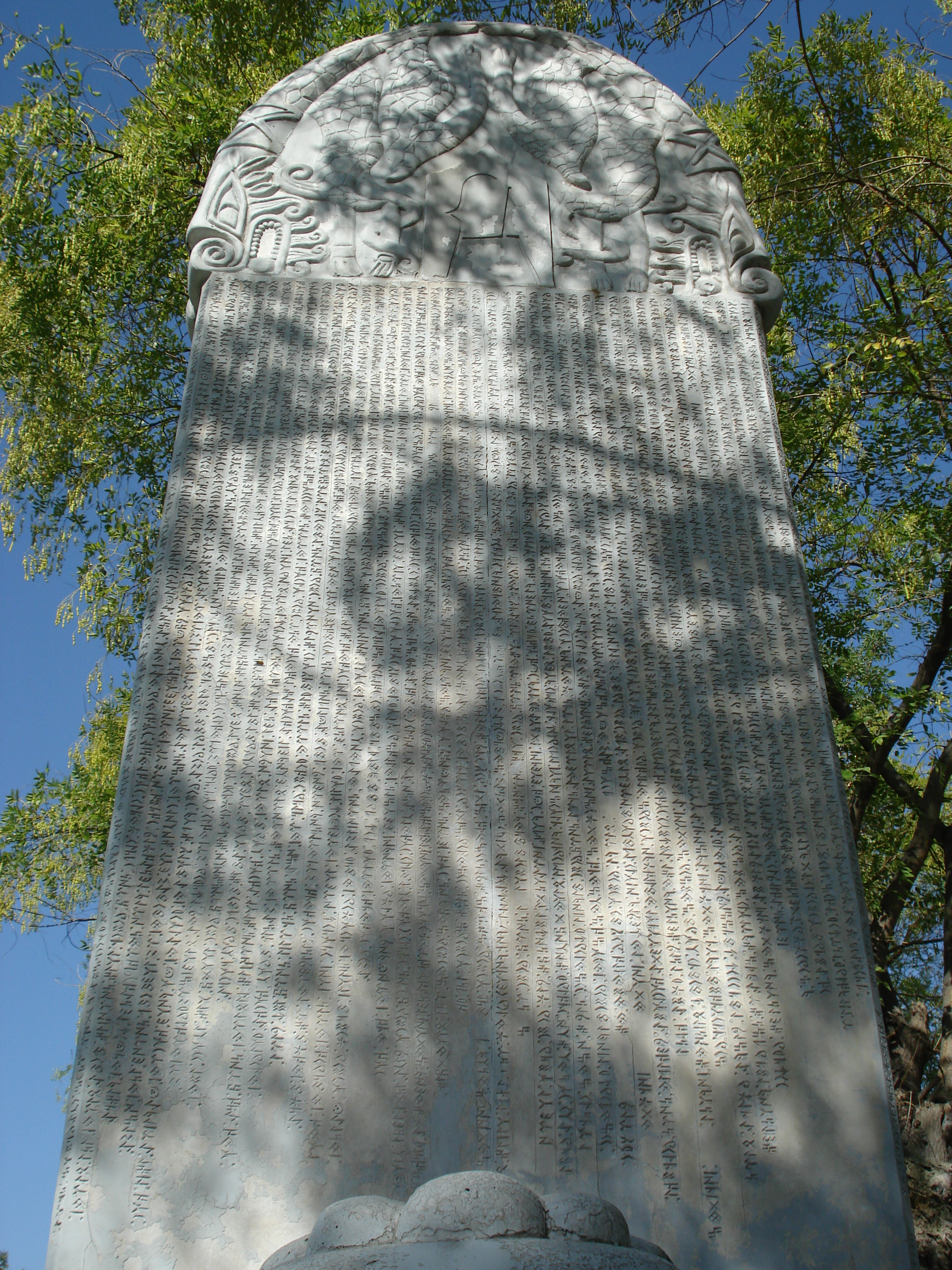
Replica of Bilge Khagan's memorial complex in Gazi University, Ankara

The two monuments themselves have engravings on all four sides. However, some of the script was not preserved. One translation of the first and second monuments seems to indicate that the text continues from one side to the other.

The first portion of the Turkic translations seems to be Bilge Qaghan discussing the commemoration of the tablet, as well as mentioning the extent of the empire:

"To the east I have made campaigns as far as the Shantung plain, and almost reached the sea; to the south I have made campaigns as far as Tokuz-Ersin and almost reached Tibet; to the west I have made campaigns beyond Yenchii-Iigiiz ('Pearl River') as far as Timir-Kapig ('the Iron Gate'); to the north I have made campaigns as far as the land of the Yer-Bayirku's. To all these lands have I led (the Turks). The forest of Mount Otiikin has no [foreign] overlord; the forest of Mount Otiikin is the place where the kingdom is held together."

The inscriptions also highlight Bilge Qaghan's accomplishment of uniting his people:

"By the will of Heaven, and because I was greatly deserving and it so brought it about, I brought the dying people back to life; for the naked people I found clothing, the poor people I made rich, the scanty people I made numerous. I have made the other, which has a kingdom and a kagan, to stand higher. All the peoples in the four quarters of the world I have brought to keeping the peace and making an end of hostilities; they all have obeyed me, and serve me."

The rest of the inscriptions are broken up and fragmentary, but seem to detail the conquests against the Kyrgyz and the Tangut peoples and also the death of Kul Tigin in battle, and eventually the succession of Bilge Qaghan by his son. Bilge Qaghan's mother, El Bilga Khatun, was also mentioned in these inscriptions.

The following is an excerpt from the last paragraph of the inscriptions (in Old Turkic and English languages):

"You, Turk Oghuz lords and peoples, hear this! If the sky above did not collapse, and if the earth below did not give way, O Turkic people, who would be able to destroy your state and institutions?"

=== Relations with the Chinese ===
The inscriptions seem to have mixed views on Tang Chinese influence. On the one hand, it seems to contain the view that the Turks despise the Chinese. It appears as though Bilge Qaghan wanted to distinguish his people from the Chinese in order to remain a strong independent society. In the inscription Bilge Qaghan reprimands those Turks who have been influenced by Chinese culture and have adopted a Chinese way of life:

"Because of want of harmony between the begs and the people, and because of the Chinese people's cunning and craft and its intrigues, and because the younger and the elder brothers chose to take counsel against one another and bring discord between begs and people, they brought the old realm of the Turkic people to dissolution, and brought destruction on its lawful kagans. The sons of the nobles became the bondsmen of the Chinese people, their unsullied daughters became its slaves. The Turkic begs gave up their Turkic names, and bearing the Chinese names of Chinese begs they obeyed the Chinese Emperor, and served him during fifty years. For him they waged war in the East towards the sun's rising, as far as Bokli kagan, in the West they made expeditions as far as Taimirkapig; for the Chinese Emperor they conquered kingdoms and power. The whole of the common Turkic people said thus: 'I have been a nation that had its own kingdom; where is now my kingdom? For whom do I win the kingdoms? said they. I have been a people that had its own kagan; where is my kagan? Which kagan is it I serve?'".

The claimed enslavement of the Turks also did not help the reputation of the Chinese. Bilge Qaghan seems to blame the Chinese for the disunion of his Turkic state. This Turkic view of the Chinese seems to be negative.

The Orkhon inscriptions indicate prisoners of war have often been designated with the status of slaves. Inscriptions found in the First Turkic Khaganate also imply that terms denoting slavery or other forms of subordinate status, such as qul (male slave) and küng (female slave or handmaiden), are frequently applied to a population of defeated political entities.

However, the translation also reveals a degree of diplomacy with the neighboring Chinese, as evidenced by his statement,

"While I have ruled here, I have become reconciled with the Chinese people. The Chinese people, who give in abundance gold, silver, millet, and silk, have always used ingratiating words and have at their disposal enervating riches. While ensnaring them with their ingratiating talk and enervating riches, they have drawn the far-dwelling peoples nearer to themselves. But after settling down near them these we have come to see their cunning."

Bilge Qaghan also references the hiring of Chinese artists when he claims,

"From the Chinese Emperor I have had artists to come, and have set them to work. My request has not been refused. They have sent the Chinese Emperor's court painters. I have bidden them set up a separate hall, and inside and out I have had them to make various paintings. I have had the stone hewn; that which lay in my heart to utter I have. Understand to see this all as far as the suns and subjects of the Ten Arrows. I have had the memorial stone hewn."

To further complicate the already muddled view of the Chinese, the inscriptions contain both Turkic and Chinese translations. Thus, the inscription contains evidence that Bilge Qaghan had cultural interaction with the Tang dynasty.

== Restoration and access ==
Both inscriptions are part of the Orkhon Valley Cultural Landscape UNESCO World Heritage Site in Mongolia. The Turkish International Cooperation and Development Agency showed interest in the site in the late 20th century and finalized their project to restore and protect all three inscriptions. Since 2000, over 70 archaeologists from around the world (specifically from Uighur, Turkmenistan, Azerbaijan, Uzbekistan, Tataristan and Turkey) have studied the area and performed excavations. The site is now protected by fences with buildings for research work and storage of artifacts. The total cost of the project is around 20 million dollars and eventually will include building a museum to house the inscriptions and other recently discovered artifacts.

== See also ==
- History of the Turkic peoples
- Old Turkic alphabet
