= Özmiş Khagan =

Özmiş Qaghan

Qaghan of the Second Turkic Khaganate
- Reign: 742–744
- Predecessor: Ilterish Alp Bilgä Qaghan
- Successor: Kulun Beg
- Died: January 6, 744
Names
- Unknown
Regnal name
- Özmiş Qaghan (烏蘇米施可汗)
- House: Ashina
- Dynasty: Second Turkic Khaganate
- Father: Pan Kul Tigin (判闕特勤)

Özmiş Qaghan (Chinese: 烏蘇米施可汗; pinyin: Wūsūmǐshī Kèhán) was the penultimate qaghan of the Second Turkic Khaganate. He was killed by the Basmyl chief Ashina Shi, and his head was sent to Chang'an.

== Background ==
His father Pan Kul Tigin was a shad (governor) of the Second Turkic Khaganate during the reign of Tengri Khagan. Although Pan Kul Tigin staged a successful coup against Tengri Khagan, he was killed during a battle against Ashina Shi and his Basmyls. Following a short and turbulent period where Kutluk Yabgu Khagan tried to restore the authority without success, Özmiş was elected as the new khagan in 742.

== Reign ==
The Tang dynasty had sought to vassalize Özmiş Qaghan. Initially, Özmiş agreed to visit the court of the Emperor Xuanzong of Tang and submit to the Tang dynasty, but he changed his mind and tried to keep his independence. His reluctance annoyed Emperor Xuanzong, who tasked the general Wang Zhongsi (王忠嗣) with arresting Özmiş Qaghan. Wang Zhongsi organized a coalition of three Turkic people, namely the Basmyls, Uighurs and Karluks, who had previously accepted the suzerainty of the Tang dynasty, instead of Özmiş Qaghan. The coalition defeated Özmiş Qaghan. Although Özmiş Qaghan managed to escape, he was soon defeated for the second time and was killed in 744 by Ashina Shi.

Özmiş Khagan Ashina Clan
Preceded by Kutluk Yabgu Khagan	Khagan of the Second Turkic Khaganate; 742–744	Succeeded by Kulun Beg
