= Qutluğ Säbäg Qatun =

Turkic queen

- Khatun of Second Turkic Khaganate
- Born: Ashide Suofu 阿史德娑匐
- Noble family: Ashide
- Spouse: Bilge Khagan
- Issue: Yollıg Khagan; Tengri Qaghan
- Father: Tonyukuk

Qutluğ Säbig Qatun (title - Chinese: 骨咄禄娑匐可敦; pinyin: Gǔduōlùsuōfúkědūn; personal name - Chinese: 阿史德婆匐; pinyin: Āshǐdé Suōfú, also known as Po Beg) was the khatun (queen) and then hansha (queen mother) of the Second Turkic Khaganate. She served as regent during the minority of Tengri Qaghan, from 734 to 741.

== Khatun ==
Qutluğ Säbäg Qatun's father was Tonyukuk, an apa tarkan, a title equivalent to prime minister. She married Bilge Qaghan before 717, while he was still a tegin (prince).

In 734, Bilge was killed by poison. Säbäg's sons succeeded him. After the death of her first son Yollıg Khagan in 739, her other son Tengri Qaghan (?–741) was enthroned.

== Regent ==
Tengri was young and Säbäg acted as a queen regent. However, the real power was in the hands of two shads (local governors), one in the west and the other in the east. Säbäg tried to centralize power and planned to execute the two governors. She had the governor in the west executed but Pan Kül Tigin, the governor in the east, became suspicious and revolted, killing Tengri Qaghan 742. Two years later, the empire was dissolved following a joint rebellion of Uyghurs, Karluks and Basmyls.

During the last days of the khaganate, Säbäg, together with her clan, took refuge in Tang China. Emperor Xuanzong of Tang greeted her and threw a banquet for her. She was given the title of princess, and was appointed the ruler of her people. According to the New Book of Tang, Xuanzong sent flour to her clan during the harvest season. According to Russian historian Lev Gumilev, she saved her people but not her nation.

== Sources ==
- Gumilev, L. N. (2002). Ahsen Batur, Ahsen (ed.). Eski Türkler (in Turkish). İstanbul: Selenge Yayınları. ISBN 975-7856-39-8. OCLC 52822672.
- Taşağıl, Ahmet (2012). Göktürkler (in Turkish). Ankara: AKDTYK Yayınları. pp. 359–62. ISBN 978-975-16-2460-4.
