= Ashina Nishufu =

Göktürk claimant

Ashina Nishufu (Chinese: 阿史那泥熟匐) (r. 679–680) was a member of the Ashina family. He revolted against the Tang dynasty following the fall of the Eastern Turkic Khaganate.

== Revolt ==
In 679, Ashide Wenfu and Ashide Fengzhi, who were Turkic leaders of the Chanyu Protectorate, declared Ashina Nishufu as qaghan and revolted against the Tang dynasty. In 680, Pei Xingjian defeated Ashina Nishufu. Ashina Nishufu was killed by his men. 54 Göktürks including Ashide Wenfu and Ashina Funian were publicly executed in the eastern market of Chang'an. According to Tonyukuk, Wenfu and Fengji's attempt to revolt against the Chinese and put Nishufu on the throne was a legitimate action and it was the people's fault that they deposed and killed him subduing themselves to the Chinese again.

== Etymology ==
His name combines two titles: the first 泥熟 (EMCh: *niei-źiuk) < nīžuk, possibly identifiable with nezak, a non-Turkic title of unknown etymology, formerly used by Hephthalites and later adopted and re-used by the Turks; the second 匐 (MC: *bək̚) transcribes Turkic bäg.
