= Yollıg Khagan =

Qaghan of the Second Turkic Khaganate
- Reign: 734–739
- Predecessor: Bilge Qaghan
- Successor: Tengri Qaghan
- Born: Ashina Yiran 阿史那伊然
- Died: 739
- Spouse: Yusaifu (餘塞匐)
- House: Ashina
- Father: Bilge Qaghan
- Mother: Säbäg Qatun
- Religion: Tengrism

Yollıg Khagan (Old Turkic: 𐰖𐰆𐰞𐰞𐰃𐰍:𐱅𐰃𐰏𐰤 Pronunciation: Yollıg Tigin, Chinese: 伊然可汗; pinyin: Yīrán Kèhán, personal name: Chinese: 阿史那伊然; pinyin: Āshǐnà Yīrán; 734–739?) was the fifth ruler of the Second Turkic Khaganate.

He was Bilge Khagan's son. Besides being author of Orkhon Inscriptions, nothing much is known about him. His wife Yusaifu left for the Tang after 744.

Yollıg Khagan Ashina Clan
Preceded by Bilge Khagan	Khagan of the Second Turkic Khaganate; 734–739	Succeeded by Tengri Qaghan
