= Basmyls =

7th–8th-century tribe of Dzungaria

The Basmyls (Basmyl; Basmals, Basmils, Old Turkic: 𐰉𐰽𐰢𐰞, romanized: Basmïl, Chinese: 拔悉蜜/密/彌; pinyin: Báxīmì/mì/mí, Middle Chinese ZS: *bˠɛt̚-siɪt̚-miɪt̚/mˠiɪt̚/miᴇ; or as 弊剌 Bìlà, MC *bjiej^{H}-lat) were a 7th- to 8th-century Turkic nomadic tribe who mostly inhabited the Dzungaria region in the northwest of modern-day China.

Originally a forest people, the Basmyls eventually grew in importance and played a prominent role in the Turkic politics from the 6th century. Basmyl supreme leaders were the first to use the term Ydyk-kut, which replaced khagan; Qocho Uyghur rulers of Turpan likewise titled themselves Ydyk-kuts. The title contains two components: the first component Ïdïq/Ydyk means "[heaven]-sent, sacred"; the second component kut/qut in the title is often found in Old Turkic onomastics and titulature and has the lexical meaning "grace" or "blessing".

In 720 CE, the dynastic Basmyl clan were reported to be concentrated at Beiting Protectorate, near Gucheng (Qitai), in the Bogda Shan range, and to be Ashina Turks (Ch. 突厥 pinyin Tu-jue).

Mahmut Kashgari, an 11th-century historian, lists the Basmyls as one of ten prominent Turkic tribes and enumerates the locations of the Turkic polities from the borders of the Eastern Roman Empire to the borders of China in the following sequence:

1. Bäčänäk;
2. Qifčāk;
3. Oğuz;
4. Yemēk;
5. Bašğirt;
6. Basmyl;
7. Qāi;
8. Yabāqu;
9. Tatār;
10. Qirqiz.

Kashgari also noted that "Among the nomadic peoples are the Čömül - they have a gibberish (raṭāna [رَطَانَة]) of their own, but also know Turkic; also Qāy, Yabāqu, Tatār and Basmil - each of these groups has its own language, but they also know Turkic well"."

The Basmyls may be ancestral to the Argyn of the Middle Juz of modern Kazakhstan. Marco Polo apparently mentioned them as "Argons" in a country called "Tenduc" (around Kuku-Khotan, or modern-day Hohhot), during the 13th century. Polo reported that this tribe who had "sprung from two different races: to wit, of the race of the Idolaters of Tenduc and ... the worshippers of Mahommet. They are handsomer men than the other natives of the country, and having more ability, they come to have authority; and they are also capital merchants."

== History ==
=== Etymology ===
The Basmyl ethnonym is etymologisable as Turkic: the first component *bas- means "to crush, press, oppress make a surprise attack" in Proto-Turkic; the other, *-mïl, is the Oghuric cognate of Common Turkic nominalizing suffix *-miš/-*mïs. Thus "Basmıl may be viewed as Oğuric Turkic bas- + -mıl = 'the tribe that crushed (its opponents),' Basmıš in Common Turkic. This was typical of Turkic tribal names that denoted aggressiveness." This prompted Golden to further posit that Basmyls were Oghuric speakers who remained east after their cousins had migrated west.

=== Khaganate period ===
According to Tongdian, the Basmyls originally lived dispersed on the snowy mountains, hunted on skis, and dwelt south of Beiting Protectorate and the Northern Sea (i.e. Lake Baikal) and southeast of Yenisei Kyrgyz; the "courageous and powerful" Basmyls numbered 2,000 families, and had leaders but no princes (Tigin) Since 552, the Basmyls became a part of the First Turkic Khaganate, who might have recognized Basmyls' economic or political importance enough to appoint an Ashina yabghu over the Basmyls. When this khaganate split into Eastern and Western Kaganates in 604, the Basmyls found themselves in the Western Turkic Kaganate, dominated by the Eastern Turks. Following state administrative reforms in favor of the eastern part of the Kaganate, the Basmyls lost their position of primacy along with the tribes of Karluks, Yagma, Kipchaks, Chumi, Chuyue (from whom emerged Shatuo). In 641 disgruntled tribes, including the Dzungarian Basmyls, joined a revolt by pretender to the throne Yugu-Ukuk. The Chinese Tang empire used the turmoil in the Western Turkic Kaganate to become the dominant regional power, and by 649, as a result of the military defeats, Bukhara and the Basmyls submitted to the Tang rulers.

The period from 649 to 703 is the best documented in Basmyl history due to the existence of Chinese annalistic records. This was also a prosperous period; vassalage did not impose any obligations and was instead afforded Chinese luxuries provided as gifts, until the Tang emperors felt confident enough to introduce their own bureaucracy to supplant the rule of the traditional Türkic nobility. According to ancient Türkic succession law, a brother succeeded a brother, and a nephew succeeded his uncle in a process of lateral succession. The Chinese thought such an idea absurd, and ignored it in their acts, causing further problems on top of existing resentment of the greedy bureaucracy. This 52-year period of relative quiet ended with the rise of the restored Eastern Turkic Kaganate, and its recapture of Dzungaria and the Dzungarian Basmyls by Kutlug and Kul Tegin.

=== Rule Under Türgesh Khaganate ===
Because Chinese Tang forces in the "Western Territories" were negligible, to resist the restoration of the Türkic Kaganate, the Tang government had to accede to the rise of Turgesh, a nation descendent from Xianbei Abars and Mukri, under the leadership of an Wuzhile. In effect, the territory captured by Tang by 659 was divided between the Chinese, the Türkic Kaganate, and Türgeshes, a people who did not belong to the Tiele, Chuy, or Eastern Türküt (東突厥) group, but are first known as one of the five Duolu tribes of the Western Türküt. The Türgeshes numbered 5–700,000, and although this represented a large state for the time, they were under pressure from Arabs from the south. Given the complexity of the situation, Tang diplomacy succeeded in drawing the Basmyls into an anti-Türkic alliance that already included the Kidans, Tatabi, and a 300,000 strong Tang expeditionary army. This involved the Basmyls into one of the most exciting events of the century, and bestowed on them a place in the most celebrated Türkic compositions of the 8th century.

Under an unrealistic plan concocted in 720 in Chang'an, China against the Türkic Kaganate, the Kidans and Tatabi, and the south-western Dzungaria Basmyls were to simultaneously converge on the Bilge-kagan court from different directions. The Yenisei Kirghiz were also pressing from the north, and the Türgeshes from the west. Bilge-kagan's chancellor Tonyukuk developed a counter-plan, which involved facing the enemies one at a time, and the use of audacity and speed to compensate for their lack of forces. At the beginning of the subsequent war, the Basmyls were the first allies to join the Türkic horde but failing to find any other coalition forces turned back. Tonyukuk's Türks left them alone and following a forced march came to Beshbalyk (Ch. Beiting), which they took by surprise attack. By the time the exhausted men and horses of the Basmyls reached Bishbalyk, instead of rest and provisions they found an enemy waiting. Surrounded under the walls of the fortress, the Basmyls surrendered, and the whole campaign fell apart. The war was immortalized in the Orkhon inscriptions on the Bilge-kagan and Tonyukuk monuments.

Another inscription on the same monument takes a completely different view of the Bishbalyk operation. Likely written by a Basmyl resting behind the walls of the Bishbalyk fortress who was later probably ambushed and captured, this inscription is of dual interest as a historical document and a cultural monument. It is the first Turkic poem to be written with rhythm and rhyme, with syllabic rhythm of 4, 5, and 8 syllables in three lines making a stanza, where the eight syllable lines have central rhyme sounds as two tetrameter lines. The defeated Basmyl carved his composition on the rock: "In the Year of Monkey, in the ninth month, we secretly went to Bishbalyk. A felicitous hero is in hardship, his army in ambush. Let this man be happy there!"

=== Second Turkic Kaganate ===
A turbulent period in the history of the Second Turkic Kaganate began in 740. During Tengri-khan's rule, Tonyukuk's daughter Katun-mother Po-beg had managed to consolidate power into her hands. She then entrusted rule to a favorite, a lowly tarkhan, causing discontentment within the upper nobility. The Eastern Shad Pan-kül attacked the court, killed Tengri-khan, and enthroned a son of the deceased. But Kut Yabgu (Chinese Gudu), a rival of Pan-kül, killed the new kagan after replacing him with his brother, then in 741 Kut killed his protégé and usurped the throne.

In 742 the Uyghurs, Basmyls and Karluks rebelled simultaneously, attacking and killing the usurper then quickly created their own state. The Basmyl leader became supreme Khan, the leader of Uyghurs an eastern Yabgu, and the elteber of Karluks became a western Yabgu. The warring Türkic nobles came to terms and chose Pan-kül's son as Khagan with the title of Özmiş Khagan. These events were recorded in the "Selenga stone" inscription, which immortalized the feats of the Uyghur khan Moyanchur (Bayanchur).

The Tang court offered Ozmysh-khan asylum whereupon he sent his son to China with five thousand covered wagons containing families, and fled his horde. In 744 the Basmyls killed Ozmysh-khan and sent his head to Chang'an. His brother Baimei-khan Kulun-beg was enthroned in his place, but most of the Türkic nobles joined in the election of the Basmyl leader Elterish (Ch. Sede Ishi) as supreme Khagan. The allies soon split apart; Uyghur leader Peilo attacked and defeated the Basmyls whose leader Elterish-kagan was beheaded and his head was sent to Changan with an offer to recognize Peilo with the title Kutlug-Bilge Kül-khan. The Basmyls, under pressure from the Karluks, then joined with the Uyghurs. Al Marwazi mentioned that a chief named Basmyl was the namesake of one group among the Šārī, who were possibly Yellow Uyghurs.

=== Uyghur period ===
Kypchak Türkic domination over the Uyghur lasted from 688 to 741. The Uyghur leader received the title Shad from his father and in 742 consolidated his people into the Tokuz-Oguzes or Nine Tribes. Unlike the Ashina Türks, the Tokuz-Oguz Uyghurs were a leading but not a dominating tribe. After quelling the Basmyls and Karluks, the Uyghurs accepted them as equals.

Inscriptions on the "Selenga stone" are a main source for the record of events around 750. In 753, the Uyghurs continued their violent struggle against the Basmyls and Karluks. The war ended in 755 with the Uyghurs subduing the Karluk's eastern pasturing routes extending to the Saur and Tarbagatai.

The Uyghur tribal confederation (Tokuz-Oguz) consisted of a leading Uygur tribe (which incorporated Basmyls and eastern Karluks), six established Tele tribes of Pugu, Hun, Bayïrku, Tongra, Sijie, & Qibi, and two new A-Busi and Gulunwugusi, legally considered equal, and several subjugated tribes who paid tribute to the Tokuz-Oguz Khagan Yaglakar family. The Tokuz-Oguz tribes were in a privileged position not only in respect to the tribal union, but also vis-a-vis the Basmyls and Karluks, who in battles were always "sent in front", because they were less valued and protected.

In Dzungaria, the Basmyls lived next to the Karluks and Bayïrku, who were apparently one of the numerous tribes which in 747 battled against the Uyghurs on the side of the Basmyls. Another neighbor east of the Türgeshes were the Ograk, one of the aborigional tribes of Dzungaria, still known in the 1st century BCE as Uge. A community of Yduk-kas ("Holy People"), a reference to a Christian community, are mentioned as the Uch-Yduk ("Three Yduks") in the Orkhon inscriptions also resided within Basmyl territory.

The Basmyls remained within the Uyghur Kaganate, so called after the Uyghurs captured the leadership of the Türkic Kaganate in 752, until its demise at the hands of Yenisei Kyrgyz in 840.

== Religion ==
There is controversy regarding the spread and decline of Nestorian Christianity in Central Asia. Bishops were reported in Merv and Herat from the 5th century onwards. Muslim and Jewish merchants were active in trade at the time between China and Provence. While the ideological and political doctrines of the Turkic Kaganate did not tolerate foreign religions and the spread of Christianity in the Kaganate was limited, some Dzungaria Türks, closely connected with caravan roads and trading cities, absorbed these ideas.

The fall of the Khaganate stimulated successes for Christian proselytizing. The Basmals reportedly adopted Christianity after absorbing the fragments of the Khaganate. Some Karluks and Uyghurs apparently also adopted Christianity.

When a new war between the Uyghurs and Türgeshes flared up in 752, the anti-Uyghur coalition united Basmyls, Türgeshes, and defenders of the "trinity".

By the 13th century, however, Marco Polo alluded only to the presence of "idolatry" and Islam in the territory of the "Argons".

== Modern history ==
In modern times, the Argyn tribe has been one of the main constituents of the Middle Juz sub-confederation in Kazakhstan, and are regarded as an integral part of the Kazakh people.

The link between the Basmyls and Argyns is reinforced by Marco Polo's description of the country he called Tanduc. Polo reported that the prevailing tribe of the country were a Christian people called "Argon". A similar location is given for the Basmyls in the early Middle Ages text Zizhi Tongjian: in Beiting Protectorate, on the Bogdoshan ridge in the Guchen area.

=== Basyz ===
Anvarbek Mokeev put forward a hypothesis «about the origin of the Kyrgyz tribe Basyz from the circle of the forest tribes of Altai, who migrated there after the collapse of the once powerful union of the Basmyl tribes.» According to A. Mokeev, the Basmyls were incorporated into the Altai Kyrgyz. He identifies the ethnonym «Basmyl» with the Kyrgyz «Basyz».

== See also ==
- History of Kyrgyzstan
- History of Kazakhstan
- History of China
