= Inel Qaghan =

Qaghan of the Second Turkic Khaganate
- Reign: 716–717
- Predecessor: Qapaghan Qaghan
- Successor: Bilge Qaghan
- Regent: Tonyukuk
- Died: 716
Names
- Ashina Fuju (阿史那匐俱)
Regnal name
- Inel Qaghan (泥涅可汗 or 移涅可汗) or Tuoxi Qaghan (拓西可汗)
- House: Ashina
- Dynasty: Second Turkic Khaganate
- Father: Qapaghan Qaghan

Inel Qaghan (Old Turkic: 𐰃𐰤𐰠:𐰴𐰍𐰣, romanized: Inel qaɣan; Chinese: 泥涅可汗; pinyin: Níniè Kèhán), personal name Ashina Fuju (阿史那匐俱), was the third qaghan of Second Turkic Khaganate.

== Biography ==
=== During Qapaghan's reign ===
Inel actively participated in his father Qapaghan Qaghan's campaigns. In 699 he became lesser khagan and received 40,000 troops of the western wing from his father, so the Chinese called him Tuoxi Kehan (拓西可汗, literally the expander of the west).

He took part in battles involving the Muslim conquest of Transoxiana in 711 and 712. He was also present at the Siege of Beiting in 714, where his brother Toŋa Tegin was killed.

=== Reign ===
Inel Qaghan and his supporters were killed by Kul Tigin during a struggle for the throne. Some writers say that the law of succession was that power passed from a ruler to his younger brothers before returning to his sons. Thus the order was Ilterish Qaghan, his brother Qapaghan Qaghan, then his sons Bilge Qaghan and Kul Tigin. Inel, being Qapaghan's son, had no right on the throne. Other writers treat the matter as a coup d'état with no mention of the rules of succession.

== In popular culture ==
- Portrayed by Lee Yeong-ho in 2006–2007 KBS TV series Dae Jo Yeong.

Inel Qaghan Ashina Clan
Preceded by Qapaghan Qaghan	Qaghan of the Second Turkic Khaganate; 716–717	Succeeded by Bilge Qaghan
