= Toquz Oghuz =

Early Medieval Turkic confederation of Inner Asia

The Toquz Oghuz (Note: Old Turkic: 𐱃𐰸𐰆𐰔:𐰆𐰍𐰔, romanized: Toquz Oɣuz; Chinese: 九姓; pinyin: Jiǔ Xìng; lit. 'Nine Surnames'; Tibetan: དྲུག་རུས་དགུ་, Wylie: drug rus dgu, lit. 'Turks of Nine Bones') (lit. 'Nine Clans') was a political alliance of nine Turkic Tiele tribes in Inner Asia, during the early Middle Ages. The Toquz Oghuz was consolidated and subordinated within the First Turkic Khaganate (552–603) and remained as a nine-tribe alliance after the khaganate fragmented.

== Name ==
Oghuz is a Turkic word meaning "community" and toquz means "nine". Similarly the Karluks were possibly known as the Üç-Oğuz – üç meaning "three". The root of the generalized ethnic term "oghuz" is og-, meaning "clan, tribe"; which in turn, according to Kononov, descends from the ancient Turkic word ög meaning "mother" (however, Golden considered such a further derivation impossible). Initially the oguz designated "tribes" or "tribal union", and eventually became an ethnonym.

== Identification ==
The Toquz Oghuz were perhaps first mentioned in the Orkhon inscriptions written in the 730s. The nine tribes were named in Chinese histories as the Uyghurs (回纥), Pugu (仆骨), Hun (浑), Bayegu/ (拔野古), Tongluo (同罗), Sijie (思结), Qibi (契苾), A-Busi (阿布思) and Gulunwugusi (骨仑屋骨思). The first seven named – who lived north of the Gobi Desert – were dominant, whereas the A-Busi and Gulunwugu(si) emerged later and were accepted on an equal footing with the others some time after 743. The A-Busi apparently originated as a sub-tribal group within the Sijie and the Gulunwugu(si) as a combination of two other tribes.

Bilge Qaghan of the Second Turkic Khaganate considered the Toquz Oghuz "[his] own people". It is also mentioned in the Kul Tigin inscriptions that the Göktürks and Toquz Oghuz were fighting five times in a year.

𐱃𐰸𐰆𐰕:𐰆𐰍𐰕:𐰉𐰆𐰑𐰣:𐰚𐰤𐱅𐰃:𐰉𐰆𐰑𐰣𐰢:𐰼𐱅𐰃:𐱅𐰭𐰼𐰃:𐰘𐰃𐰼:𐰉𐰆𐰞𐰍𐰴𐰃𐰤:𐰇𐰲𐰇𐰤:𐰖𐰍𐰃:𐰉𐰆𐰡𐰃

Toquz Oγuz budun kentü budunïm erti teŋіri jer bolγaqïn üčün yaγï boltï.

"Nine Oguz people were my own people. Because of the sky being jumbled up with the earth, they became an enemy."

Likewise, foreign sources suggested the political association of some Toquz Oghuz tribes to the Göktürks. A Khotanese Saka text about Turks in Ganzhou mentioned saikairä ttūrkä chārä (< OTrk. *sïqïr türk çor). The Sïqïr Türks were identified with the Sikāri in Sogdian documents as well as the Sijie, who were mentioned as Tujue Sijie (突厥思結) in the Zizhi Tongjian. Among the Eastern Turkic tribes who dwelt south the Gobi Desert, (Note: Dobrovits (2004:259) also included the Qibi among those Eastern Turkic tribes; Qibis' status as an Eastern Turkic tribe was not evident in Tang Huiyao's text, which merely mentioned the similarity between horses of the Qibi and Göktürks south of the Gobi Desert.) Tang Huiyao listed the Sijie (erroneously rendered as Enjie 恩結), who dwelt in the Lushan military governorate 盧山都督府, and Fuli, who dwelt in the same jimi province of Dailin as the Sijie's splinter tribe A-Busi. The Fuli(-yu) (匐利[羽]), or Fuli(-ju) (伏利[具]), were identifiable as the Fuluo (覆羅) in other Chinese sources and the Bökli-Çöligil (OTrk. 𐰋𐰇𐰚𐰲𐰃:𐰲𐰇𐰠𐰏𐰠), who appeared on Kül-tegin inscription and were proposed to have originated from Tungusic Mohe, Koreans, or ethnic Turkic peoples. Kenzheakhmet (2014:297-299) links the Sijie's splinter-tribe Abusi (< OTrk. *Abïz) to the Fuli (< OTrk. *Bükeli < büke "snake, dragon" + coordinating conjunctive suffix -li, possibly). (Note: Reading the ethonym 𐰋𐰇𐰚𐰲𐰃:𐰲𐰇𐰠𐰏𐰠 as Bükli-Çöl-Igil, Kenzheakhmet further links the Abusi and Fuli to Sijie, based on his mistaken interpretation of Zuev that Zuev reconstructed Old Turkic igil for Sijie 思結 when in fact Zuev reconstructed Old Turkic igil for Xījiē 奚結, who dwelt north of the Helianzhi river.)

== Leadership ==
Another list of nine names – Yaoluoge (藥羅葛) (< OTrk. 𐰖𐰍𐰞𐰴𐰺 Yaglaqar), Huduoge (胡咄葛), Guluowu (啒羅勿), Mogexiqi (貊歌息訖), A-Wudi (阿勿嘀), Gesa (葛薩), (Note: Dunlop (1954) links the Jiuxing's Gesa 葛薩 to the Khazars; however, Dunlop's thesis has several problems: rather than to Toquz Oghuz, Chinese sources linked Khazars to the Göktürks by calling them Tūjué Kěsà bù 突厥可薩部 / Tūjué Hésà 突厥曷薩 (Tūjué 突厥 then was still reserved for Göktürks and their splinter groups, not all Turkic peoples); the syllable Kha- in Khazar was transcribed with Chinese characters 可 Kě (< LMC & EMC *kʰa^{X}) & 曷 Hè (< LMC *xʱat < EMC *ɣat) while Qa- in Qasar with 葛 Gè (< LMC & EMC *kat); Byzantine historian Theophanes the Confessor mentioned the Khazar military commander Ziebel, who was identified with Western Turkic leader Külüg Sibir.) Huwasu (斛嗢素), Yaowuge (藥勿葛), & Xiyawu (奚牙勿) – appeared in the Old Book of Tang and New Book of Tang. According to Haneda (1957), Toquz Oğuz were the Yaglaqar-led group of nine clans included in the Uyghur tribe. In contrast, Golden (1992) proposed that Toquz Oğuz were the Tang Huiyao's nine-tribe group led by the Uyghur, which in turn comprised the nine subtribes led by Yaglaqar. The Shine Usu inscription mentioned that the Yağlaqar ruled over the On-Uyğur "Ten[-Tribes] Uyghur" and Toquz Oğuz "Nine[-Tribes] Oghuz". Meanwhile, Hashimoto, Katayama, and Senga propose that the Tang Huiyao's list (led by Uyghur) contained the names of the Toquz Oghuz tribes proper, while each name in the two lists (led by Yağlaqar) in the Books of Tang recorded each surname of each of nine subtribal chiefs (e.g. Uyghur chief's surname is Yağlaqar; Sijie chief's surname is Gesa, etc.).
