= Tengri Qaghan =

Qaghan of the Second Turkic Khaganate
- Reign: 739–741
- Predecessor: Yollıg Khagan
- Successor: Ashina Shi; Özmiş Khagan (Usurper, son of Pan Kul Tigin); Kutluk Yabgu Khagan (Usurper)
- Regent: Po Beg
- Born: Ashina Kutluk 阿史那骨咄
- Died: 741
- Issue: Princess Yuzhu (餘燭公主)
- House: Ashina
- Father: Bilge Qaghan
- Mother: Säbäg Qatun
- Religion: Tengrism

Tengri Qaghan (Old Turkic: 𐱅𐰭𐰼𐰃:𐰴𐰍𐰣, personal name: Ashina Kutluk, 阿史那骨咄) (734 or 739 or 740 – 741) was the sixth ruler of the Second Turkic Khaganate.

== Background ==
Ashina Kutluk was the second son of the fourth ruler, Bilge Qaghan, and was preceded by his elder brother Yollıg Qaghan. Tengri was a minor and his mother Qutluğ Säbäg Qatun ruled during his reign.

== Reign ==
In 740, Xuanzong sent his envoy Li Zhi (李質) who declared him Tengri Qaghan. His mother Qutluğ Säbäg Qatun and chancellor Yusi Tarkhan (飫斯達幹) conspired together to centralize the state and kill the cousins who were ruling as shads (governors) in the west and the east. While they succeeded in killing the western shad, the eastern shad Pan Kul Tigin rebelled and marched on the capital. He captured Tengri and executed him, causing his mother to flee.

== After death ==
Pan Kul Tigin crowned his son Özmiş as Qaghan in 741 and himself as regent. However, he was quickly defeated and executed by Ashina Shi (阿史那施) who marched to the capital and executed both Kutluk Yabghu and Özmiş, declaring himself qaghan.

== Sources ==
- Christoph Baumer, History of Central Asia, volume 2, p 263.
- Lev Gumilyov, The Ancient Turks, 1967, Chapters xxiii+xxvi (long account in Russian at: )
  Tengri Qaghan Ashina Clan
  Preceded by Yollıg Qaghan	Qaghan of the Second Turkic Khaganate; 739–741	Succeeded by Kutluk Yabgu Qaghan (Usurper); Ashina Shi (Basmyl chief); Özmiş Qaghan (son of Pan Kul Tigin)
