= Bilge Qaghan =

Fourth Qaghan of the Second Turkic Khaganate

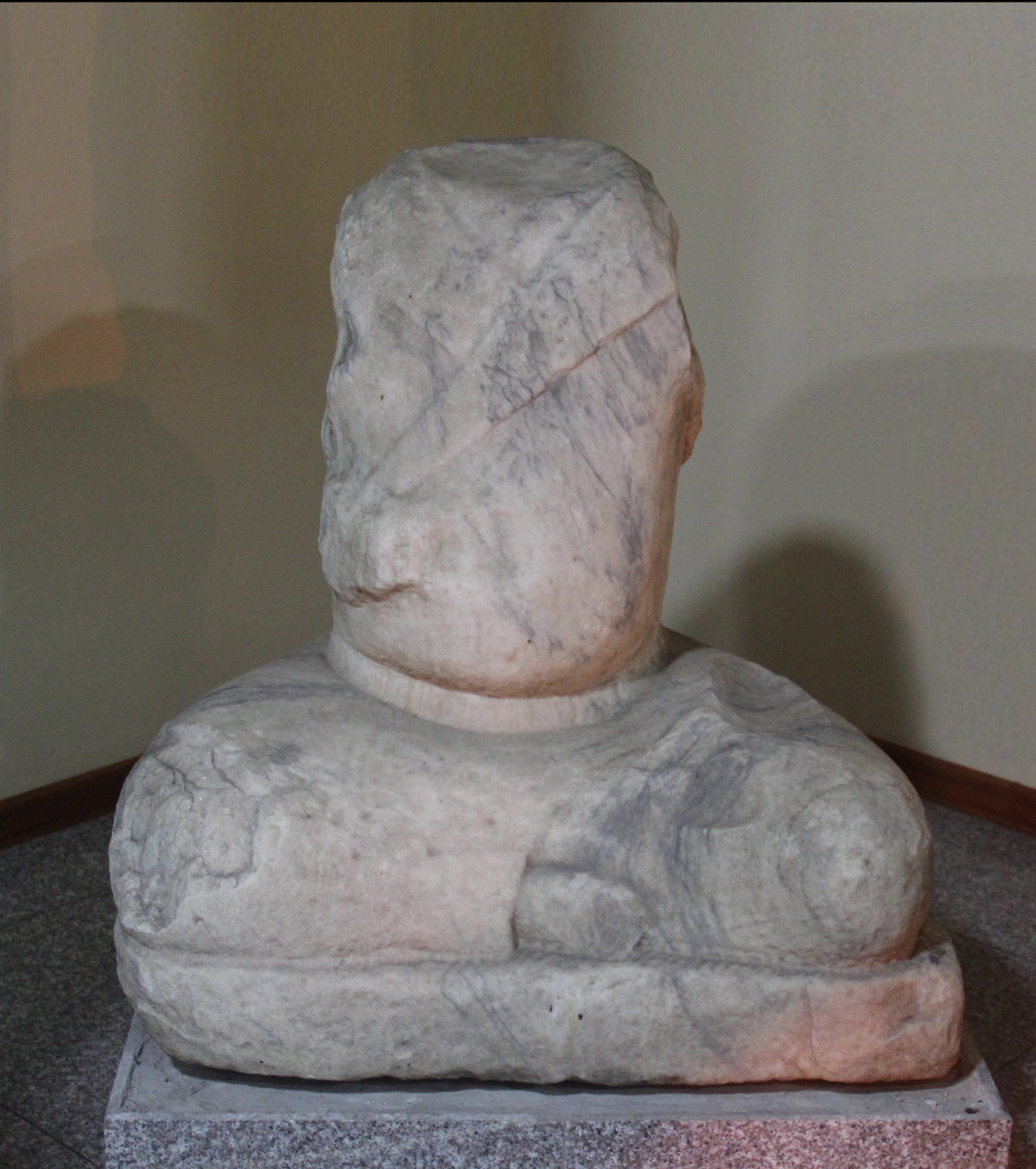
- Marble Statue of Bilge Khan

Qaghan of the Second Turkic Khaganate
- Reign: February 717 – 25 November 734
- Predecessor: Inel Qaghan
- Successor: Yollıg Khagan
- Regent: Tonyukuk
- Born: Ashina Mojilian 阿史那默棘連; 683
- Died: 25 November 734 (aged 50–51); Otukan
- Spouse: El Etmish Bilge Khatun
- Issue: Yollıg Tigin; Tengri Tigin; Two unnamed sons
- House: House of Ashina
- Father: Ilterish Khagan
- Mother: El Bilga Khatun
- Religion: Tengrism

Bilge Qaghan (Old Turkic: 𐰋𐰃𐰠𐰏𐰀:𐰴𐰍𐰣, romanized: Bilgä Qaɣan; Chinese: 毗伽可汗; pinyin: píjiā kěhàn; 683 – 25 November 734), born Ashina Mojilian (Chinese:阿史那默棘連), was the fourth qaghan of the Second Turkic Khaganate. His accomplishments were described in the Orkhon inscriptions.

== Names ==
As was the custom, his personal name and the name after assuming the title qaghan were different. His personal name was recorded in Chinese characters as 阿史那默棘連 (pinyin: Ashǐnà Mòjílián). His name after assuming the title was Bilgä Qaγan. Chinese: 毗伽可汗; pinyin: píjiā kěhàn).

== Biography ==
=== Early years ===
Bilge Qaghan was born in 683, in the early years of the Second Turkic Khaganate. He campaigned alongside his father from early childhood. He was made Tardush Shad and given command over the western wing of the khaganate in 697 by Qapaghan Qaghan. He annihilated Wei Yuanzhong's army in 701 with his brother. He also reconquered the Basmyl tribes in 703. He subdued Yenisei Kyrgyz forces in 709, after their disobedience he reconquered them and killed their qaghan in 710. He killed the Türgesh khagan Saqal at the Battle of Bolchu.

In the later years of Qapaghan's reign, he fought four battles in the span of a starting in 714, resubduing tribes, He was nearly was killed in an ambush from Uyghur forces in 716.

=== Reign ===
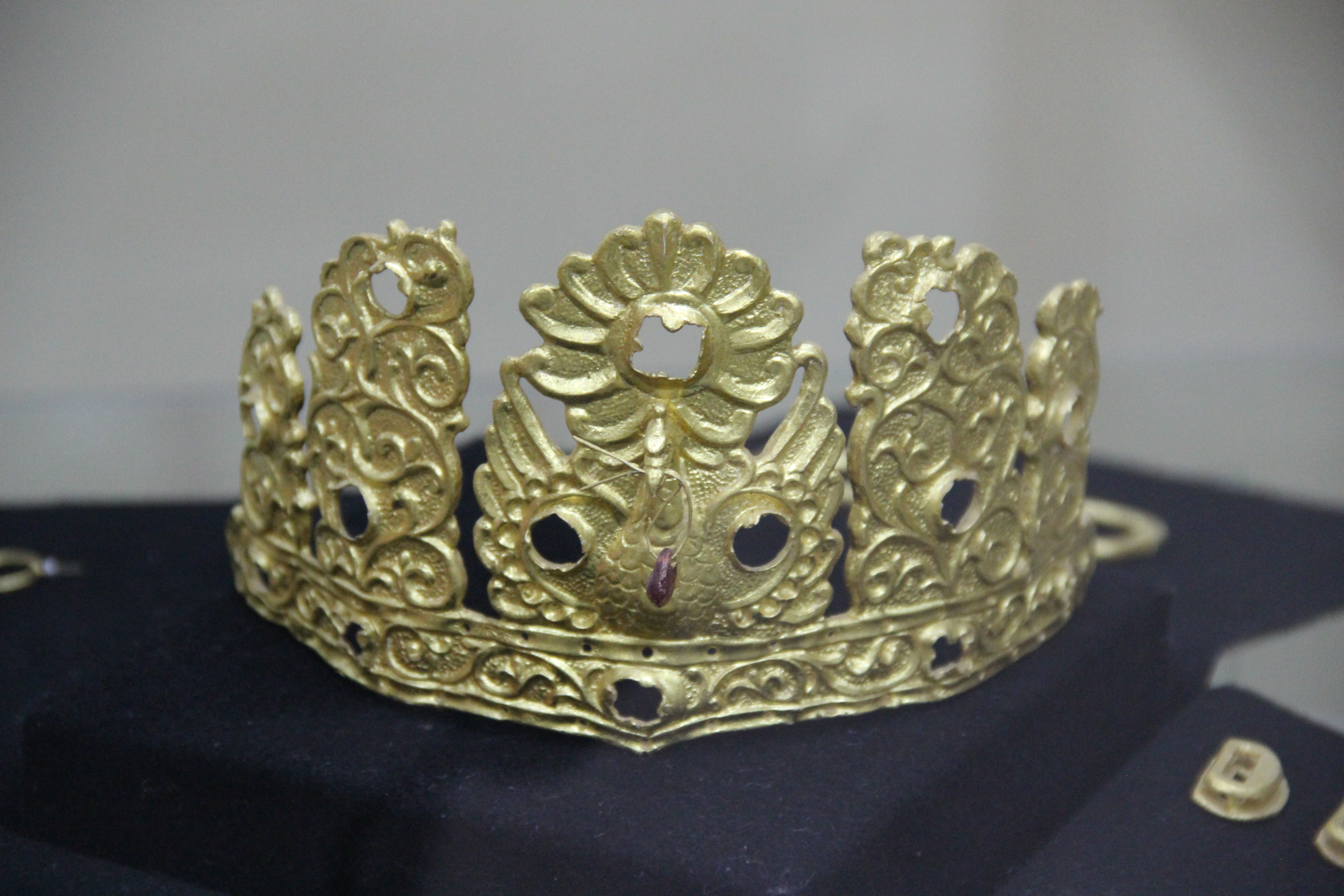
Gold diadem of Bilge Khagan from the burial site at Khoshoo Tsaidam.

Qapaghan Qaghan was killed in 716 during his campaign against the Toquz Oghuz alliance with his severed head being sent to Chang'an. Although his son Inel Qaghan succeeded him, Bilge's brother Kul Tigin and Tonyukuk carried out a coup d'état against Inel Qaghan. They killed him and made him Bilge qaghan. His name literally means "wise king".

He appointed Kul Tigin as the Left Wise Prince, which made him the second most powerful person in the khaghanate. He re-subdued the Uyghurs in 716. He also appointed his father-in-law Tonyukuk as his master strategist.

New reforms and the stabilization of the regime, caused tribes that had fled the khaganate to come back. Tang chancellor Wang Jun, believing that the Göktürks who surrendered would try to flee back to the khaganate, suggested that they be forcibly moved into the heart of the empire to prevent them from doing so. Before Wang's suggestion could be acted upon, however, there was an uprising by the Göktürks who surrendered, under the leadership of Xiedie Sitai (𨁂跌思泰) and Axilan (阿悉爛). Xue Ne and Wang tried to intercept them and dealt them defeats, but they were able to flee back to the khaghanate anyway. This defeat led to Xue Ne's retirement.

=== Later reign ===
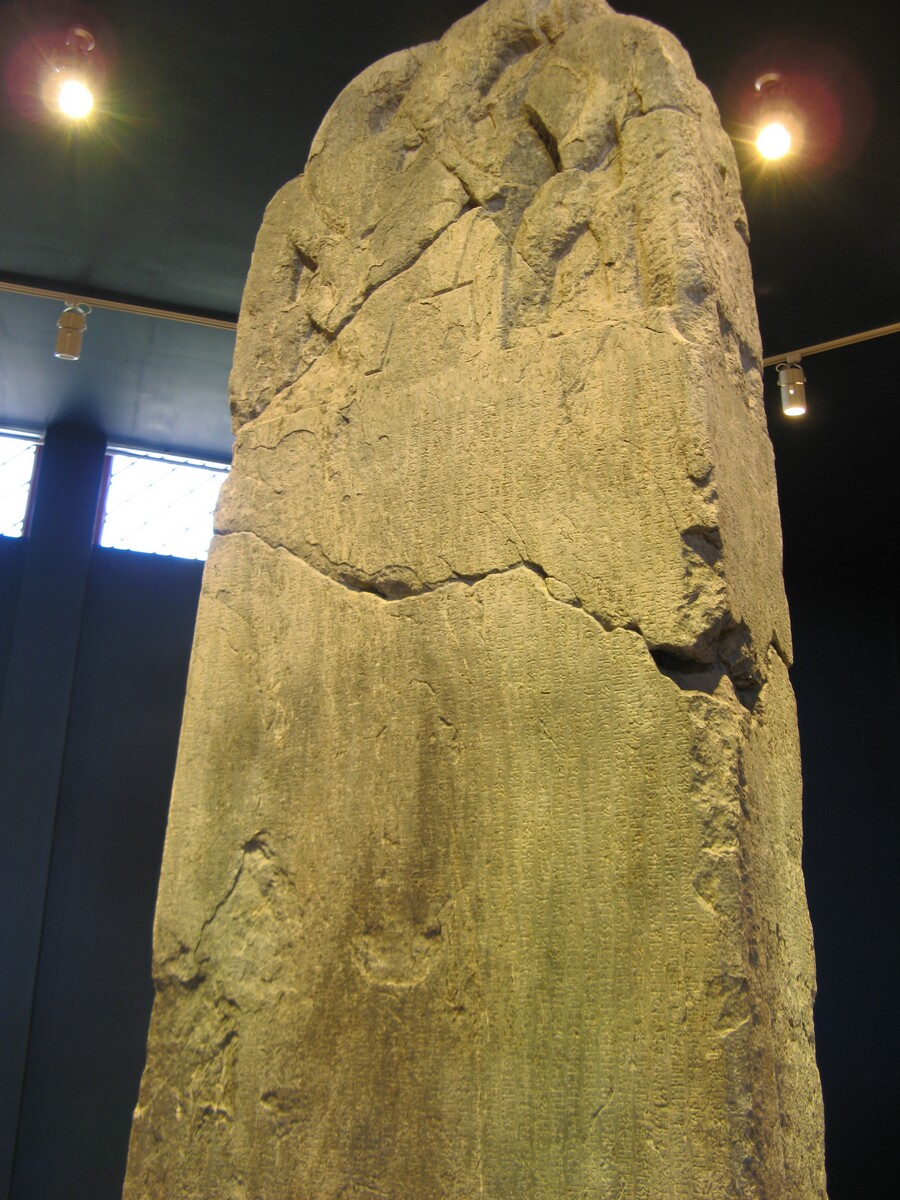
The Bilgä Qaghan monument with inscriptions, Mongolia

In 720, Wang believed that the Pugu (僕固) and Xiedie tribes of the region were planning to defect to Turkic Khaganate and attack with Turkic troops. He thus held a feast and invited the chieftains, and, at the feast, massacred them. He then attacked the Pugu and Xiedie tribes in the area, nearly wiping them out. He then proposed a plan to attack Bilge Qaghan along with the Baximi, Xi, and Khitan. Emperor Xuanzong also recruited Qapaghan Qaghan's sons Bilgä Tigin and Mo Tigin, the Yenisei Kyrgyz Qaghan Kutluk Bilgä Qaghan and Huoba Guiren to fight the Göktürks. Tonyukuk cunningly launched a first attack on Baximi in the autumn of 721, completely crushing them. Meanwhile, Bilgä raided Gansu, taking much of the livestock. Later that year the Khitans, next year Xi were also crushed.

In 726, his father-in-law and chancellor Tonyukuk died.

In 727, he sent Buyruk Chor (Chinese: 梅錄啜/梅录啜; pinyin: Méilù Chuò) as an emissary to Xuanzong with 30 horses as a gift. He also warned him of Me Agtsom's proposal of an anti-Tang alliance. This warning proved to be true when Tibetan general We Tadra Khonglo invaded Tang China in 727, sacked Guazhou (瓜州, in modern Gansu), Changle (常樂, in south of modern Guazhou County), Changmenjun (長門軍, in north of modern Yumen) and Anxi (安西, modern Lintan).

On 27 February 731, Kul Tigin died, for which Qaghan mourned and ordered a great funeral ceremony.

In 733, he defeated rebellious Khitan tribes.

=== Death ===
Just after sending an emissary to Xuanzong to gain a heqin alliance, he was poisoned by Buyruk Chor. He did not die immediately and had time to punish the family of Buyruk Chor with death. He died on 25 November 734, his burial ceremony took place on 22 June 735.

== Religious policy ==
At some point in his life, Bilge Qaghan thought about converting to Buddhism and settling in cities. However, Tonyukuk discouraged him from this, citing the Turks' few numbers and vulnerability to Chinese attacks. While the Turks' power rested on their mobility, conversion to Buddhism would bring pacifism among the population. Therefore, sticking to Tengrism was necessary for survival.

== Family ==
He was married to El Etmish Bilge Khatun, Tonyukuk's daughter. He had several children:

- Ashina Yiran (阿史那伊然)
- Ashina Kutluk (阿史那骨咄)
- 2 unnamed sons who both became puppet Qaghans under Kutluk Yabgu Khagan
- A daughter who was married to Suluk

== Legacy ==
After his death from poisoning, several steles were erected in the capital area by the Orkhon River. These Orkhon inscriptions are the first known texts in Old Turkic.

== In popular culture ==
- Bilge Qaghan is portrayed by Kang Jae-ik in the 2006–2007 KBS TV series Dae Jo-yeong.

== See also ==
- Silver Deer of Bilge Khan

== Sources ==
- Encyclopædia Britannica, Micropaedia, Vol. II, pp. 16–17

Bilge Qaghan Ashina Clan
Preceded by Inel Khagan	Khagan of the Second Turkic Khaganate; 717–734	Succeeded by Yollıg Khagan
