= Ashide =

Turkic royal clan

阿史德 Āshǐdé

Regions with significant populations
- Central and East Asia

Languages
- Old Turkic; Middle Chinese; Sogdian

Religion
- Tengrism; Buddhism (minority)

The Ashide (Chinese: 阿史德; Middle Chinese: *ʔɑ-ʃɨ^{X}tək̚; Old Tibetan: A sha sde’) were a Turkic tribe and a high ranking noble family in Turkic Khaganate. It was related to the ruling dynasty of the Turkic Khaganate, the Ashina tribe.

== Origin ==
According to Zheng Qiao's 1161 Tongzhi (vol. 29), the Ashide descended from an ancient Shǐshàn kèhán 始善可汗 (lit. "First Good Khagan"), whose identity remains unknown.

== Etymology ==
Peter A. Boodberg derives both 阿史德 *’âşitək, whence Ashide, and 阿史那 *’âşinâ, whence Ashina, from one Proto-Turkic root *aş- ("to cross [a mountain]").

The Ashide's status as the Ashina's conjugal clan is documented in the Youyang Zazu, which contains a myth that Ashina's ancestor Shemo fell in love with the sea-goddess west of the Ashide cave.

Yury Zuev reconstructed Old Turkic *Aştak, further from Middle Persian Azdahāg, from Avestan Aži Dahāka "Serpent, Dragon", related to Azhdaha.

H. W. Bailey, apud Golden (2018), noticed similarity between Ashide and Iranian *xšaita ‘ruler’, cf. Sogd. xšēδ, axšēδ ‘ruler’.

== Notable members ==
Ashide clan's tamga

The baga-tarkhan (military leader) of four Göktürk khagans, Tonyukuk and the mother of Chinese warlord An Lushan were both of Ashide origin.

== Ashide and Ashina ==
Historian S. G. Klyashtorny said that originally Ashina and Ashide together were part of a dual system, well known among the Turkic and Mongolic peoples.

Ashide chiefs bore the title Irkin (Hanzi: 俟斤; Pinyin: Sijin) common with tribal leaders in the Turkic Khaganate. However, their particular position is determined by kinship with the dynasty; it was no coincidence that one of Irkin Ashide tegin held the title 'the prince of the royal family'. The Ashide clan did not have a single source. The New Book of Tang mentioned Da Ashide and Bayan Ashide; their tamgas differ from tamgas of the Ashide.

To the end of the 7th–8th centuries, it was probably more correct to speak about the Ashide as one of the tribes of the khaganate, which together with the Ashina was the main military and political support of the Turkic dynasty. Ashide leaders initiated the liberation revolt of the Turkuts (679–682) against the Tang dynasty.

== Bibliography ==
1. Азат Абдысадыр уулу: Первые из тюрков. Тюркютские роды "Ашина" и "Ашидэ"
2. Кляшторный.Г. Древнетюркская надпись на каменном изваянии из Чойрэна//СНВ. Вып. XXII. М.: 1980. С. 90-102.
