= Golden Crown of Bilge Qaghan =

Crown of Bilge Qaghan
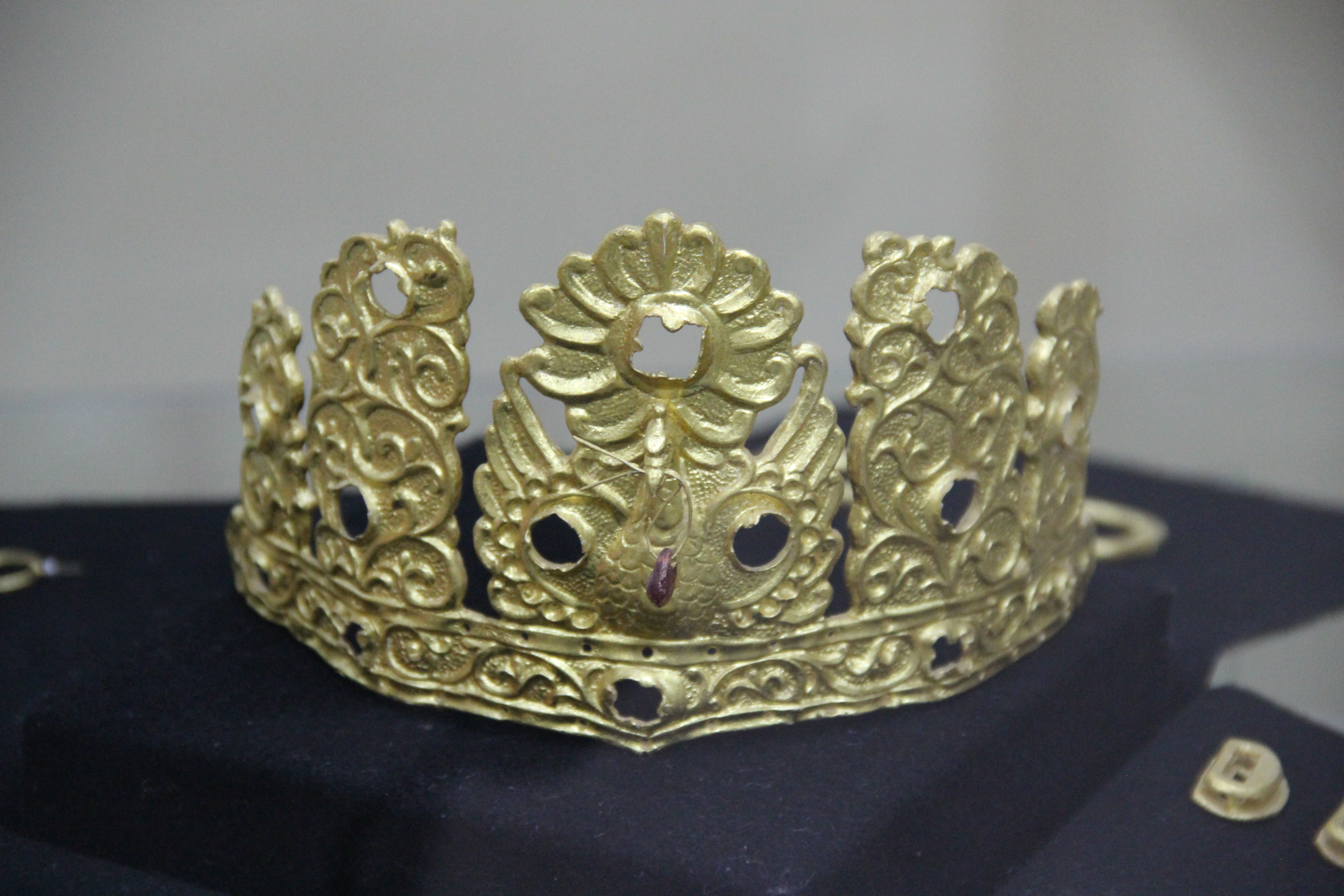
- Gold diadem of Bilge Khagan from the burial site at Khoshoo Tsaidam. National Museum of Mongolia.
- Material: Gold, gemstones
- Size: 25.7 cm × 9.8 cm (10.1 in × 3.9 in)
- Weight: 81 g (2.9 oz)
- Symbols: Phoenix
- Created: 6th-8th century
- Place: Tomb of Bilge Qaghan, Orkon Valley
- Present location: National Museum of Mongolia, Ulaanbaatar
- Culture: Turkic period

The Crown of Bilge Qaghan is a golden crown dating to between the 6th and 8th centuries that was unearthed at the complex of Bilge Khan in Khöshöö-Tsaidam, Orkhon Valley, Mongolia. It was created at the time of the Central Asian Second Turkic Khaganate, and is thought to have been manufactured by a local artist. The diadem bears a resemblance to the headgear of the Bust of Kul Tigin.

== Overview ==
The diadem was found at the excavations carried out at Orkhon. The golden crown and the belt, found at the site, are thought to have belonged to Bilge Khan. Similarities between this diadem and the headgear of the Bust of Kul Tigin, believed to represent Bilge's brother, have also been noted.

=== Excavation ===
The complex, located about 400 km from Ulaanbaatar, stands between Orkhon River and Khosho Tsaydam Lake. It was excavated between 2001 and 2003. The excavation complex consisted of a three main parts, 72 meters long and 36 wide. In the center, close to the bark (barque, barq, "chapel") was an inscriptive monument. The platform was 15x15 m and 70 cm high. The inside and outside were decorated with pictures, with balbabs (550 in total) inscribed with Bilge Khan's seals to the walls, and there was a pipe system extending to the waterway to the east. Outside the complex there were ditches 6.5 m wide and 3.5m deep.

The diadem was found in the complex of Bilge Khan. It was found surrounded by a mud-brick wall, decorated with inscriptions and depictions of war scenes. One of the surviving bricks of the wall is decorated with a war scene. There were statues of Bilge Khan and his families in the barq, while an altar stood on the west side. A memorial grave was unearthed during the excavations carried out around the altar, about one meter and half from it, to the north.

There were silver flowers in the area surrounding the altar, some melted by fire. A total of 2556 silver flowers were found piled underneath. Just beneath the flowers were the silver deer statutettes and 9 silver plates and one handled side of a chest. Following the silver items was the golden crown, a broken golden belt and a large golden plate. In this area were also loose gems, probably belonging to the crown of the belt.

=== Historical context and description ===
The Golden Crown of Bilge Khan has similarities with the Bust of Kul Tigin found at the neighbouting site (1 km to the north). The object, decorated with a floral motif, is made up of a strip of thin sheet of gold. On it are attached five upright panels. The front panel has an image of a phoenix, very similar to the eagle on the Bust of Kul Tigin, whereas the side panels have tendril ornaments decorating them. The phoenix holds a precious stone in its mouth. There are a total of 14 holes in the crown. Lower and upper sides of the crown's band have a row of small perforations. These might have attached the diadem to another item, such as a hat. The crown originally was inlaid with stones, some of which were found around it during the excavation. This finding and that of Bust of Kul Tigin show that a tiara-hat with an eagle was used by the Eastern Turks. However, according to Stark, the tiara-hat was not used by the Khan, since it seems unlikely that the Khan Bilge and Tegin wore the same headgear.

Some years before the death of Bilge Khan, a group of Tang Chinese artists had come to the court of Bilge khan, who after summoning them ordered them to build a barq for his brother (in the neighboring Kul Tigin Complex). In the Orkhon inscriptions they are said to have also produced some paintings and sculptures, which is confirmed in the Old Book of Tang. It is thought that the Chinese produced the Bust of Kul Tigin. However, the Crown of Bilge Khan is thought to be the production of a local, Central Asian, or possibly Chinese, artisan, and to have been manufactured locally, in one of the workshops of one of the Eastern Turkic residences. The early Turks, whose Second Turkic Khaganate stretched from Eastern to Central Asia, were noted for their ability in metallurgy. Their culture also received influences from Chinese, Iranian, Indian, and Byzantine civilisations, combining these elements in their own distinct culture. No "direct analogies" with this kind of crown have been found in the early Turkic steppes. However, similar examples have been found in Sogdia and in Eastern Turkestan. Stark speculates that the idea for the crown's model may have a "distant Indian origin".

=== Restoration and current status ===
The findings from the complex were turned to the National Museum of Mongolia, and they were restored at the Art Center of Mongolia in 2001. The restoration was carried out in Ulaanbaatar by a team of Turkish and Mongolian participants. The crown and many other objects from the complex, including the Silver Deer, are now on display at the National Museum of Mongolia.

In 2003, the diadem was registered in the list of invaluable cultural heritage of Mongolia.

== See also ==
- Bust of Kul Tigin
- Silver Deer of Bilge Khan
- Göktürks
- Second Turkic Khaganate
- Bilge Qaghan
- Orkhon inscriptions
