= Battle of Ming Sha =

Battle between the Tang dynasty and Second Turkic Khaganate

Date	707
Location	China
Result	Göktürk victory

Belligerents
Second Turkic Khaganate	Tang dynasty

Commanders and leaders
Qapaghan Qaghan; Kul Tigin; Bilge Qaghan	Shazha Zhongyi (WIA)

Strength
300-800	90,000

Casualties and losses
Unknown	At least 6,000 +10,000; 30,000

The Battle of Ming Sha was a major battle between the Tang dynasty and Second Turkic Khaganate which occurred in 707.

== Battle ==
Kul Tigin and Bilge Qaghan were also present in the Göktürk army under the command of Qapaghan Qaghan. The Göktürks attacked them. Here, the 80.000 strong Tang army under the command of Shazha Zhongyi, sent by the Tang dynasty against the Göktürks in Kul Tigin inscription, Kul Tigin's role in the war is described as follows:

During the battle, Kul Tigin mounted first on Tadık Çor's gray horse, then on Isbara’s gray horse, and then on Yiğin Siliğ Bey’s dressed doru horses and attacked the Chinese, but all horses were dead. They shot Kul Tigin with more than 100 arrows from his armor and robe, but the arrows didn’t touch Kul Tigin's Face and head

When Shazha Zhongyi realized that he would be defeated, he fled from the battle. Some sources mentioned that 13.000 Chinese soldiers died, also Bilge Qaghan said that he destroyed his army. This battle is mentioned in Kul Tigin inscription.

In another Göktürk inscription, the Bilge Qaghan inscription, this battle is mentioned as follows:

At the age of 22 I went on a campaign against the Chinese. I fought Shazha Zhongyi’s army of 80.000 and killed them!
