= Ötüken =

Ancient capital of the Turkic peoples

Ötüken or Otuken (Old Turkic: 𐰇𐱅𐰜𐰤:𐰖𐰃𐱁, romanized: Ötüken yïš, lit. 'Ötüken forest' or 𐰵𐱅𐰜𐰤:𐰘𐰼, romanized: Ötüken jer, lit. 'land of Ötüken'; Old Uighur: 𐰵𐱅𐰜𐰤:𐰘𐰃𐱁, romanized: Ötüken yïš; Chinese: 於都斤) was the capital of the First Turkic Khaganate, the Second Turkic Khaganate and the Uyghur Khaganate. It has an important place in Turkic mythology and Tengrism.

Ötüken is located within the borders of the Arkhangai Province and Övörkhangai Province of present-day Mongolia.

== Mountain ==
The word was used to describe the sacred mountain of the ancient Turks. It was mentioned by Bilge Khagan in the Orkhon inscriptions as "the place from where the tribes can be controlled". A force called qut was believed to emanate from this mountain, granting the local potentate the divine right to rule all the Turkic tribes.

Although never identified precisely, Ötüken probably stretched "from the Khangai Range of Central Mongolia to the Sayan Mountains of Tuva, at the centre of which is the Orkhon Valley", which for centuries was regarded as the seat of imperial power on the steppes.

== Primary sources ==
=== Dīwān Lughāt al-Turk ===
Ötüken (اتوكان) in Mahmud al-Kashgari's Dīwān Lughāt al-Turk:

Name of a place in the deserts of Tatār near Uighur.

=== Tonyukuk inscriptions ===
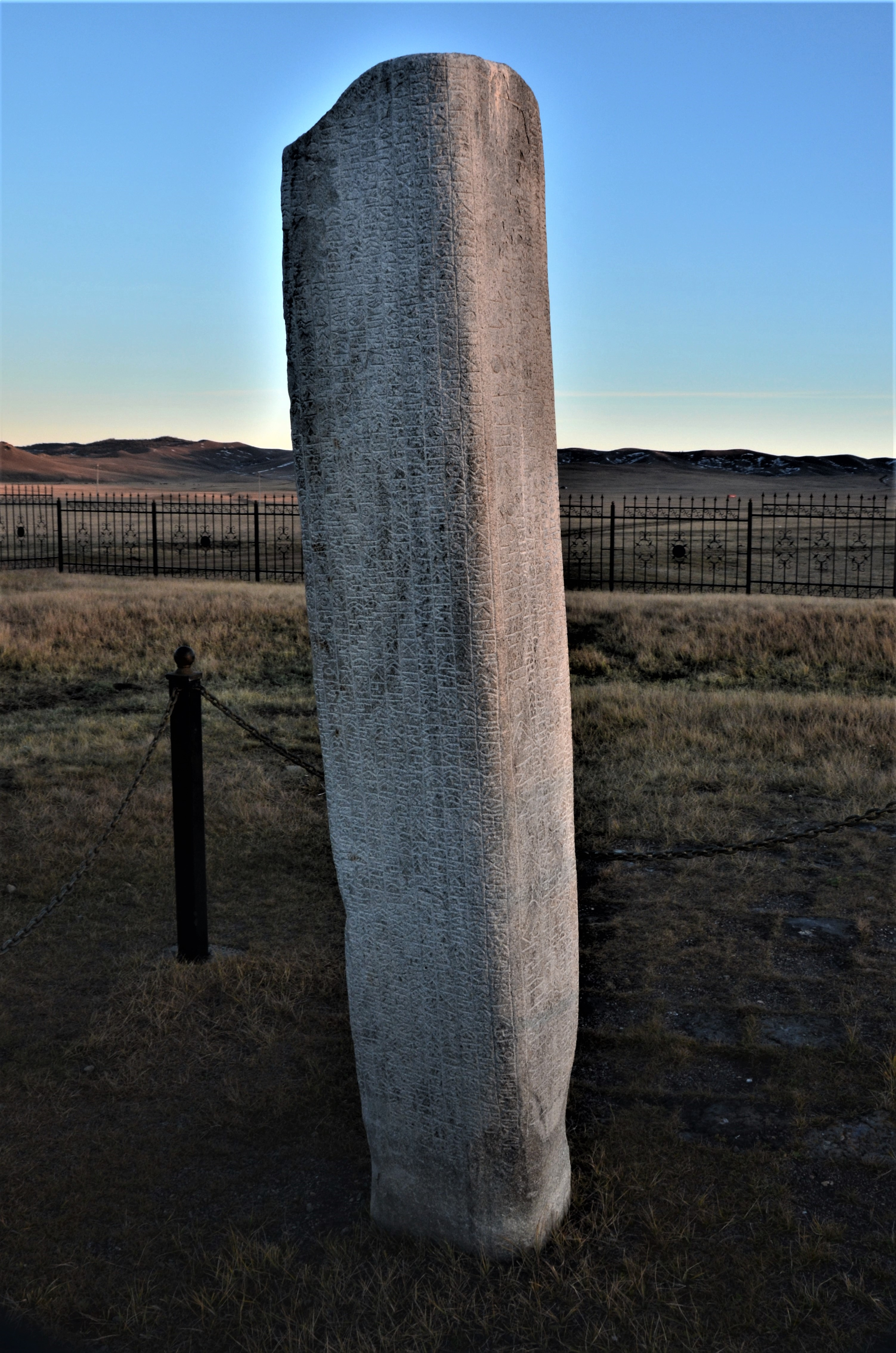
Turkic inscriptions of the 8th century on two steles dedicated to Bilge Tonyukuk in Mongolia.

The Tonyukuk inscriptions show the sacred importance of the region, as evidenced by the statement of Tonyukuk:

If you stay in the land of the Ötüken, and send caravans from there, you will have no trouble. If you stay at the Ötüken Mountains, you will live forever dominating the tribes!

=== Qocho manuscripts ===
It can still be seen in post-imperial Uyghur Manichaean documents from Qocho, in which the Ötükän continues to be recognized as a spiritual, power-granting center, even after a change in religion from the Tängri faith:

Since the Ötükän Realm deigned to give power, may the divine good fortune of the Realm of Ötükän of the earlier wise fathers, the divine good fortune of the rulers, the divine good fortune of this holy throne be placed upon our divine king the Iduqqut.

== See also ==
- Etugen Eke
- Otgontenger
- Karakorum

== Bibliography ==
- C. E. Bosworth: Artikel "ÖTÜKEN" in: Encyclopaedia of Islam; Leiden. Digitale Edition
