= Sir-Kıvchak =

Extinct Turkic people

Sir-Kıvchak were a Turkic people whose existence is controversial and who were proposed to be precursors to the Kipchaks who settled in East Europe in the 10th century.

== Name ==
The Sir appeared as Xinli 薪犁 (OC: *siŋ-ri(:)l) in Sima Qian's Records of the Grand Historian but were not referred to again until the 7th century as Xue 薛 (MC: *siᴇt̚).

In the Bain Tsokto inscriptions of 720s erected by Tonyukuk, the name Türük "Turks" is mostly accompanied by the name (E)Sir (Old Turkic script: 𐰾𐰃𐰼). According to S.G.Klyashtorny and T.İ. Sultanov this shows the importance of Sir element in the Second Turkic Khaganate (681-744) This opinion is possibly supported by the fact that in the Khöshöö Tsaidam Monuments erected in 735 for Bilge Khagan, the name Sir follows the name Türük and precedes other tribal names.

== Origin ==
After the defeat of the short lived Xueyantuo khanate in 646, Sir people escaped to west. In 679-681 term they supported Turkic revolt against the Tang Empire in China. After the Turkic Empire was restored they took part in the formation of the new empire.

== Uyghur Khaganate ==
Uyghurs, who replaced the Second Turkic Khaganate possibly mentioned the Kïvchak, instead of Sir, as the tribe who accompanied the Turks in their Moyun Chur monument. Thus it seems that the names Sir and Kïvchak were used interchangeably and Kïvchak was the name Sir people assumed after the collapse of the Turkic Empire. Klyashtorny proposed that the new name Kïvchak means "unfortunate" in Old Turkic language, probably referring to the problems they encountered after the collapse of the empire. Kïvchak remnants escaped to west to Kimek territory. The Kipchak people of the later era likely descended from the Kïvchak of the 8th century. However, this early attestation of the ethnonym Kipchak is uncertain as damages on the inscription leave only -čq (𐰲𐰴) (*-čaq or *čiq) readable. S.E.Malov, G.Aidarov and S.Karzhaubai have read this as Türük Qïbčaq, however the group which took part in the Mongolian and Japanese expedition in 1996-1998, did read the relevant passage as türk qaγan čaq älig yïl olurmïš ("I heard that the Turuk qayans sat on the throne exactly for fifty years").

== Other views ==
According to The Cambridge History of Inner Asia, however, the identification of Sir people with the Kipchak is not well established.
