= Silver Deer of Bilge Qaghan =

Silver artifact

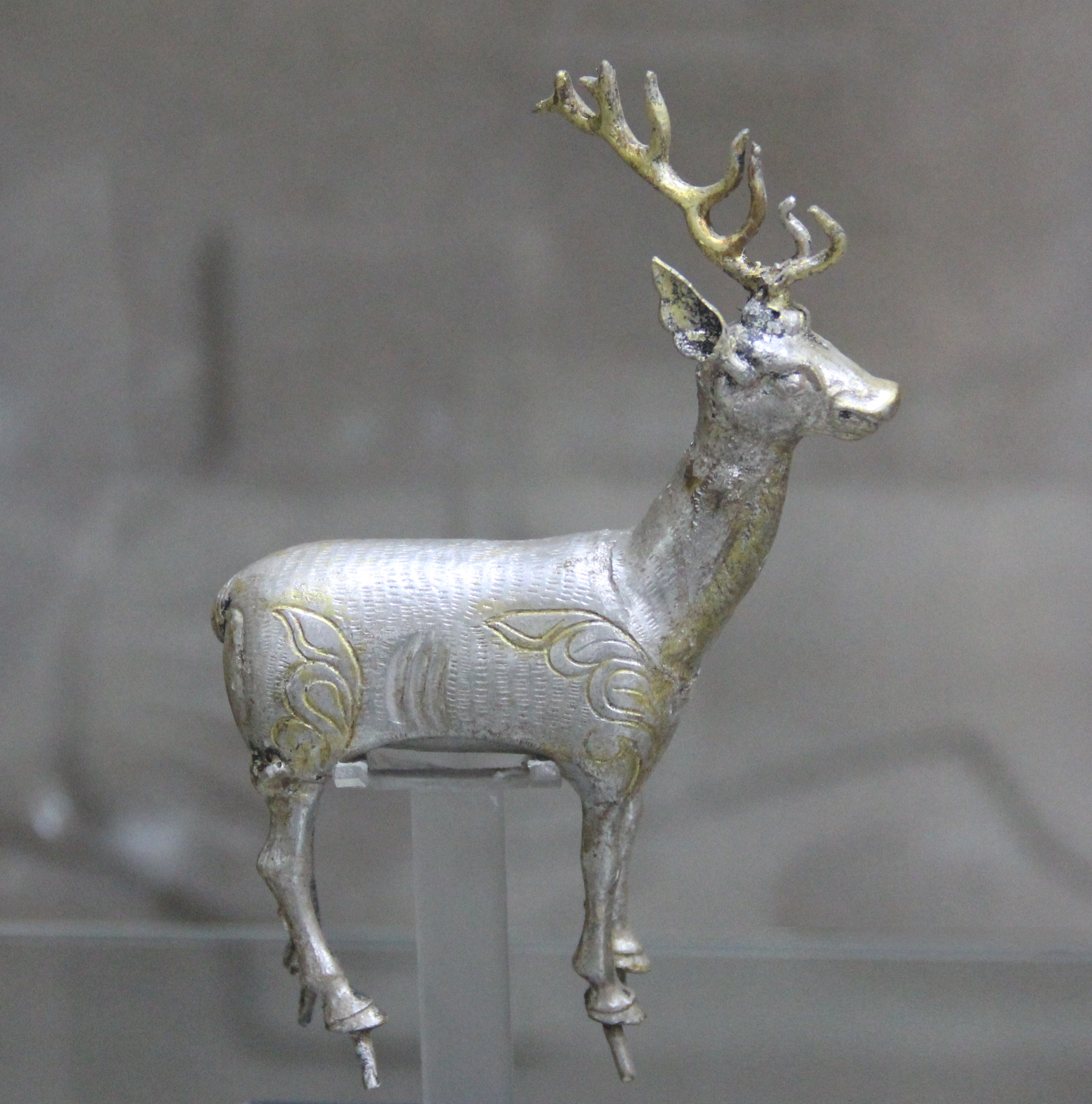
- Material: Silver
- Size: 16 cm × 12 cm (6.3 in × 4.7 in)
- Weight: 243.1 g (8.58 oz)
- Created: 7th century
- Place: Tomb of Bilge Qaghan, Orkon Valley
- Present location: National Museum of Mongolia, Ulaanbaatar

The Silver Deer of Bilge Qaghan is a 7th- or 8th-century silver and silver-gilt artifact extracted from the tomb of Bilge Qaghan, the burial complex of the fourth Qaghan of the Second Turkic Khaganate. It was discovered in 2001 during excavations carried out in Orkhon Valley, at the future Bilge Khan Monumental Grave Complex, located about 400 km (250 mi) from Mongolia's capital Ulaanbaatar, between the Orkhon River and Khosho Tsaydam Lake.

The artifact was produced in the 7th century, during the Turkic period of rule in the Orkhon Valley, in the Second Turkic Khaganate. The deer has been praised for its proportions and its skillful engravings. It shows the high level of craftsmanship reached at the time. The figure of the deer was symbolically important to the Turks, and it also features in other noted artworks located in northern Mongolia, the so-called Deer stones.

== Background ==
The Göktürks "Celestial" or "Blue Turks" lived in the Altai Mountains and their southern hills. At this time, they were already at an advanced state of melting iron metals and making iron items. The Göktürks densely inhabited the surroundings of the River Laoha, where gold and silver belongings, part of which were robbed, were found. Gold and silver objects, including 99 arc ornaments were discovered, with the items bearing the features of the Göktürks. They preferred to make buckets from iron and gold. The Göktürks were known for their skills as blacksmiths. As part of the heterogeneous Rouran Khaganate, against whom they later rebelled, going on to found the First Turkic Khaganate, the Turks lived for generations north of the Altai Mountains, where they "engaged in metal working for the Rouran". There is an anecdote in which the Rouran Khagan calls Bumin, the future Qaghan, a "blacksmith slave", which indicates that the Turks specialized in metallurgy for the Rouran (possibly in a state of vassalage, or unequal alliance). On occasion of the death of his brother, Bilge Khan called up from China a group of artisans who helped to build a barq and completed a number of paintings and stone sculptures at the Burial Complex of Kol Tigin, located about 1 km north of Bilge Khan's complex. Stark notes that while the Tang Chinese artisans are likely to have sculpted the marble Bust of Kul Tigin, found in the latter's complex, the golden diadem found at the complex of Bilge Khan was likely the work of a Central Asian artist. Indeed, Chinese culture wasn't the only influence. Ying notes that the objects found at Boma, Zhaosu County, Xinjiang, belong to the Turkic Empire, and that these Central Asian populations "transmitted material and cultural achievements between East and West, but also combined in their own distinct culture the elements of different civilisations," like Iranian civilisation, Indian, Byzantine, Chinese. A similar stag from the Tibetan Empire was found. It once belonged to a Tibetan aristocrat. The Sogdians were merchants and artisans, who crisscrossed Asia, trading goods from Tibet, India, China, as well as fur from the northern steppes. They were famed for their artistic skills, especially in metallurgy, and had Turks and Chinese among their patrons.

Bilgä Qaghan's name literally means "wise king". Born in 683, he was already campaigning with his father in his childhood. He was created as Tardush shad and given command over the western wing of the empire in 697 by Qapaghan. He annihilated Wei Yuanzhong's army in 701 with his brother. He then reconquered Basmyl tribes in 703 and subdued Yenisei Kyrgyz forces in 709, which, after their disobedience, he had to reconquer, killing their Qaghan. He killed Türgesh khagan Suoge at Battle of Bolchu. In later years of Qapaghan, he fought four battles in a year starting from 714, resubduing tribes and nearly was killed in an ambush from the Uyghurs in 716. In 716, the second Khan Qapaghan was killed in his campaign against the Toquz Oghuz and his severed head was sent to Chang'an. His son Inel Khagan succeeded him, but Bilgä's brother Kul Tigin and Tonyukuk carried out a coup d'état against him, killing him and making Bilgä Qaghan.

Bilgä Qaghan was poisoned, but he did not die immediately and had time to punish the family of the poisoner with death. He died on November 23, 734. His burial ceremony took place on June 22, 735.

== Description ==
This decorative ornament was restored between 2001 and 2003 in Ulaanbaatar, at the National Center for Cultural Heritage.

The horns were welded to the head, which was welded to the body. The legs were also welded to the main body. The artifact shows an experienced use of casting, of bas-relief engraving, gilding and welding. The development of craftsmanship can be seen in the deer's features. Its engraved fur and flower patterns show the level of craftsmanship achieved at this time. A sharp tool was used to engrave the statuette around the animal's horns, mouth and ears, and to carve a pattern on its shoulder. This pattern is also on the hips and tail, and the marks were gilded with gold. The pattern is in the form of a leaf, and it points backwards. The deer's fur was also skillfully engraved over the neck, the body and the legs.

The ornament displays skillfulness in casting and carving, and is appreciated for its model proportions. The deer has large eyes, pointed ears and big antlers. The artifact has pegs below its hooves. This suggests that the deer was attached to another item, probably a standing base.

The Silver Deer was registered in the list of invaluable heritage of Mongolia on May 21, 2003, as per the Government of Mongolia-issued Order no.124.

=== Significance ===
The well-known Deer stones, made of granite or greenstone and erected by nomads in the Bronze Age, around 1000 BCE, are typical of northern Mongolia. Indeed, the cult of deer existed among many nomadic and hunting tribes already in the Neolithic and Bronze Age.

The deer was considered to be the mediator par excellence between the worlds of gods and men by the Turkic people; thus at the funeral ceremony the soul of the deceased was accompanied in their journey to the underworld (Tamag) or abode of the ancestors (Uçmag) by the spirit of a deer offered as a funerary sacrifice (or present symbolically in funerary iconography accompanying the physical body) acting as psychopomp. A late appearance of this deer motif of Turkic mythology and folklore in Islamic times features in the celebrated tale of 13th century Sufi mystic Geyiklü Baba (meaning "father deer"), of Khoy, who in his later years lived the life of an ascetic in the mountain forests of Bursa – variously riding a deer, wandering with the herds of wild deer or simply clad in their skins – according to different sources.

The Silver Deer of Bilgä Qaghan reflects the nomadic tradition of worshiping deer during the Turkic period.

== Excavation ==
The complex, located about 400 km from Ulaanbaatar, stands between Orkhon River and Khosho Tsaydam Lake. It was excavated between 2001 and 2003. The excavation complex consisted of a three main parts, 72 meters long and 36 wide. In the center, close to the bark (barque, barq, "chapel") was an inscriptive monument. The platform was 15x15 m and 70 cm high. The inside and outside were decorated with pictures, with balbabs (550 in total) inscribed with Bilge Khan's seals to the walls, and there was a pipe system extending to the waterway to the east. Outside the complex there were ditches 6.5 m wide and 3.5m deep. The complex was surrounded by a mud-brick wall, whose inside and outside were decorated with inscriptions and depictions of war scenes. The wall's upper part had bricks, and one of the surviving ones is decorated with a war scene. In the barq were placed the statues of Bilge Khan and his families, while an altar stood on the west side. A memorial grave was unearthed during the excavations carried out around the altar, about one meter and half from it, to the north. At the site were found two silver deer figurines, a golden crown and belt, a golden water beaker, hollow wares and broken pieces of a silver chest containing about four and a half thousand items made of gold and silver were found at the site. These chests and the other items, including the deer, were found in the basement, between the grave and the altar. The complex is thought to have been built in 735 A.D. There were silver flowers in the area surrounding the altar, some, less than 20 cm deep from the altar, melted by fire. Below the flowers, with nine silver plates and the upper flank and plates of the chest, were the two deer statuettes. The deer's legs and the horns were broken. The findings were turned to the National Museum of Mongolia. They were transported to the Art Center of Mongolia for restoration in 2001. A team of Turkish and Mongolian participants, supported by TİKA, carried out the restoration in Ulaanbaatar. The monuments and the many objects, including the Silver Deer, from the Turkish era are now on display at the National Museum of Mongolia.

== Orkhon Valley ==
Waterfall in Orkhon Valley

Orkhon Valley, where the Silver Deer was found and the Bilge Khan Complex is located, is thought to have been for centuries the seat of power in the steppes. This archaeologically rich area was home to successive nomadic cultures that evolved in harmony with, and within the limits of, the natural steppe landscape. The valley was continuously occupied by Huns, Turkic people, Uighurs, Kidans, and finally the Mongols. In this valley, Turkish memorial sites and burials dating from the 6th–7th centuries were found. The Orkhon inscriptions were found here. This stele with runic inscriptions was also erected by Bilge Qaghan. 25 miles to the north of the stele, in the shadow of the sacred forest-mountain Ötüken, was the capital of the first Uyghur Khaganate, Ördü (8th–9th centuries).

Mountains were considered sacred in Tengriism as an axis mundi, but Ötüken in Orkhon Valley was especially sacred because the ancestor spirits of the khagans and beys resided here. Moreover, a force called qut was believed to emanate from this mountain, granting the khagan the divine right to rule the Turkic tribes.

The OVCL (Orkhon Valley Cultural Landscape) is located in present-day Mongolia. Over 120,000 ha of grassland, along the historic Orkhon River, are covered by the site. It also has a buffer zone, measuring about 61,044 ha. Some modern features were introduced into the landscape, which however remain mostly natural.

== In contemporary culture ==
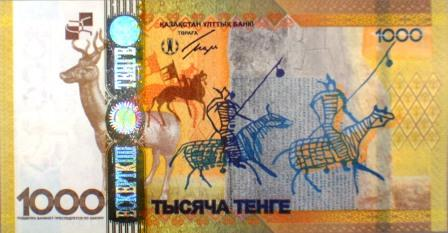
Kazakhstan banknote with Silver Deer of Bilge Khan (2013).

The Silver Deer of Bilge Khan is depicted on a KZT 1,000 tenge banknote, issued by the Kazakh government. The issue of the commemorative banknote was confirmed by the Kazakh government on December 12, 2013. The banknote was dedicated to the Second Turkic Khaganate on both sides, with the Silver Deer on one side, and the Bust of Kul Tigin on the other. About 10 million banknotes were put in circulation by the National Bank of Kazakhstan.

== See also ==
- Göktürks
- Second Turkic Khaganate
- Bilge Qaghan
- Orkhon inscriptions
- Golden Crown of Bilge Qaghan
