= Eastern Turks =

The Eastern Turks may refer to the following polities and their people:

- Eastern Turkic Khaganate
- Second Turkic Khaganate
