= Iron Gate (Central Asia) =

Defile in Central Asia

Coordinates: 38.211°N 66.973°E

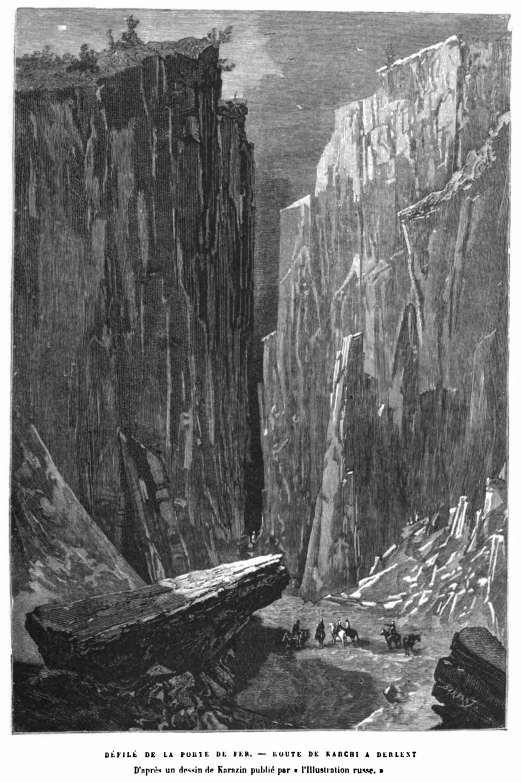
Wood engraving, p. 503. From 'Nouvelle Géographie Universelle, La terre et les hommes', Part VI, 'L'Asie Russe', Édition Élisée reclus, Paris, 1881

The Iron Gate (Uzbek: Buzgalaxona; Old Turkic: 𐱅𐰢𐰼:𐰴𐰯𐰍, romanized: temir qapïɣ in Orkhon and Tonyukuk inscriptions; Persian: دربند Darband, Chinese: 鐵門關; pinyin: Tiěménguān), is a defile between Balkh and Samarkand. It breaks up the mountains which extend from the Hisar range south towards the Amu Darya. In ancient times it was used as the passage between Bactria and Sogdia and was likely of great importance to any power in the region. Its name comes from the belief that an actual gate, reinforced with Iron, stood in the defile. It is located to west from Boysun, Surxondaryo Region. Although its exact location is debatable, it is usually considered to be the 3-kilometre (1.9 mi) pass on the road from Samarkand (Uzbekistan) to Balkh (Afghanistan) and close to Qarshi city. According to historian Lev Gumilev its present name is "Buzgala".

== In the Orkhon Inscriptions ==
Medieval Turks controlled the Silk Road during the Göktürk Empire. It was an important source of revenue. Temir Kapig was a strategically important point to control the Silk Road.

Orkhon inscriptions (also known as Khöshöö Tsaidam monuments) which were erected in 730s, are about Bilge Khagan, a Turkic emperor and his brother Kul Tigin. Bain Tsokto inscriptions which were erected shortly before the Khöshöö Tsaidam monuments are about Tonyukuk, the counselor of Bilge. In all of these inscriptions, the geographical name Temir Kapig had been mentioned several times. Below are some examples.

=== In Kültigin's inscription (South side) ===
In west, I sent an army over the Pearl River to the Iron Gate

=== In Bilge Khagan's inscription (East side) ===
(Referring to Bumin Khagan) He annexed all territory from Kadıgan forest in the east to the Iron Gate in the west.

=== In Tonyukuk's inscription (2nd monument, South side) ===
(Referring to campaign in 701) We reached the Iron Gate

== Sources ==
- "Islam Encyclopaedia". Archived from the original on May 8, 2014.
- Gumilev, Lev Nikolayeviç (2002). Eski Türkler. İstanbul: Selenge. ISBN 975-7856-39-8.
- Klyashtorny, S.G; Sultanov, T.İ (2003). Türkün Üçbin Yılı. İstanbul: Selenge. ISBN 975-8839-03-9.
- Elgin, Muharrem (1980). Orhun Abideleri. İstanbul: Boğaziçi.
- Taşağıl, Ahmet (2012). Göktürkler. Ankara: AKDTYK. ISBN 978-975-16-2460-4.
