= Tonyukuk inscriptions =

Turkic inscription in Nalaikh, Mongolia

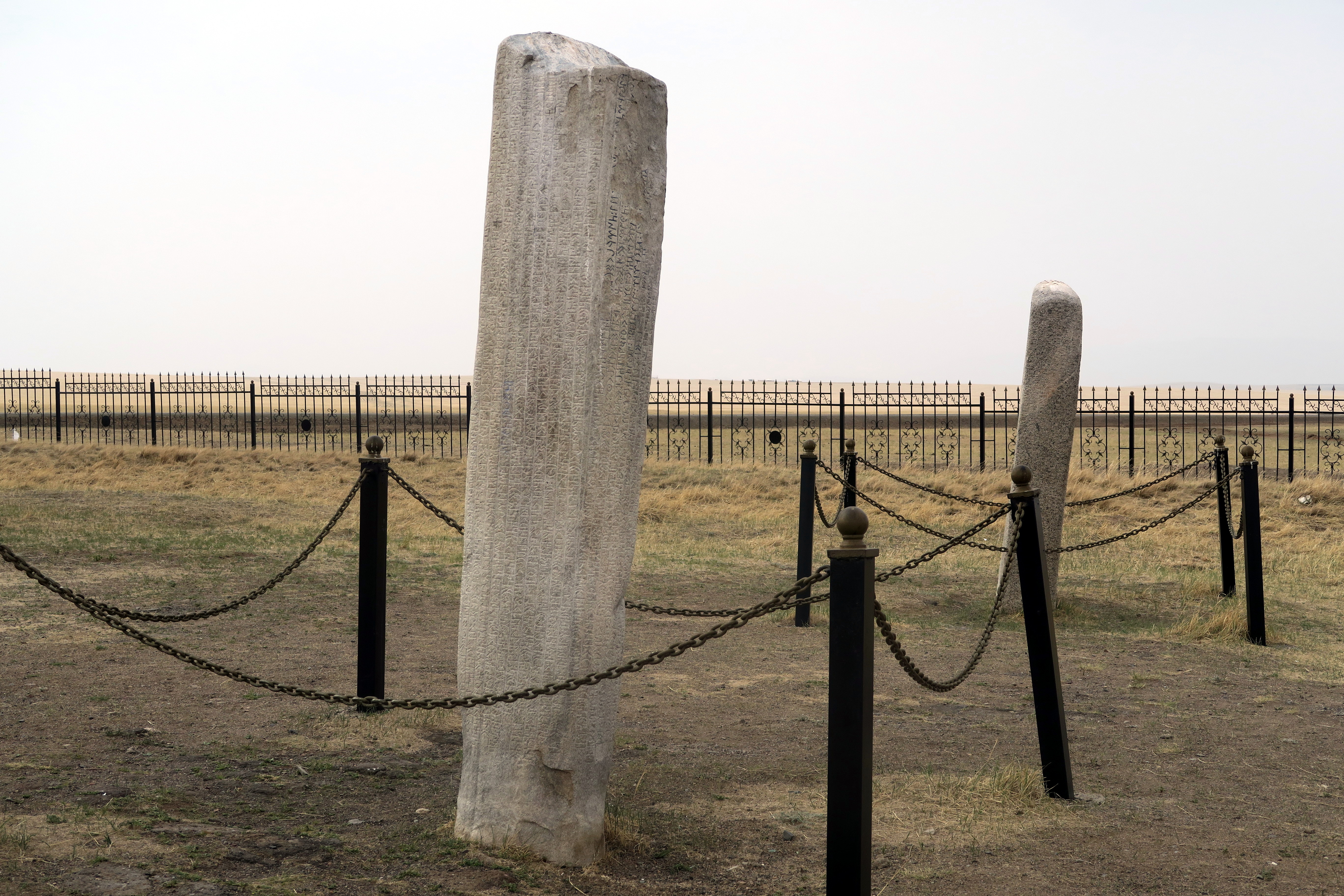
- Turkic Bilge Tonyukuk Inscriptions - part of Orkhon Inscriptions in Mongolia

- Location within Mongolia Location within Asia
- 47.69449°N 107.47594°E
- Type: Tomb
- Location: Nalaikh, Ulaanbaatar, Mongolia

The Tonyukuk inscriptions (Chinese: 暾欲谷碑), also called the Bain Tsokto inscriptions are Turkic inscriptions of the 8th century located in Nalaikh, Ulaanbaatar, Mongolia. They are one of the oldest written attestations of the Turkic language family, predating the Orkhon inscriptions (Khöshöö Tsaidam monuments) by several years.

== Geography ==
The inscriptions are in Tuul River valley at 47°42′N 107°28′E (in Nalaikh, Ulaanbaatar). They are often confused with, or considered as a part of, the Orkhon inscriptions (Khöshöö Tsaidam inscriptions), although the Orkhon inscriptions are actually located about 360 kilometres (220 mi) to the west of Bain Tsokto.

== History ==
Bain Tsokto inscriptions are about Tonyukuk, the counselor of four Turkic khagans which are Ilterish Khagan, Kapaghan Khagan, Inel Khagan and Bilge Khagan of the Second Turkic Khaganate. He died in the 720s. Unlike the two other Orkhon inscriptions which were erected after the hero had died, Bain Tsokto inscriptions were erected by Tonyukuk himself around the year 716. (His deeds after 716 had not been narrated.) The narrator is Tonyukuk. The inscriptions were inscribed on two steles. The writing, which proceeds vertically from top to bottom, is in the Old Turkic alphabet.

== Summary of the text ==
=== 1st stele (35 lines) ===
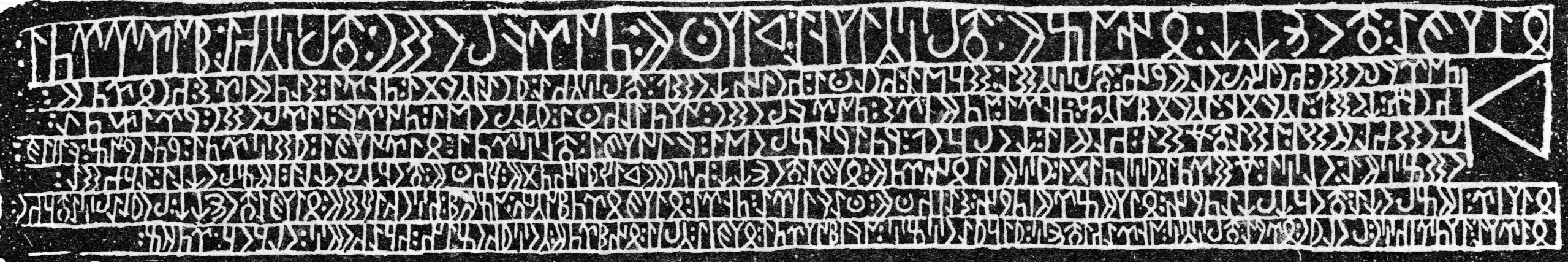

West side: The revolt of Turks against the Tang dynasty in 681. (After the Tang subjugated the Turks in 630)
South side: War against Oghuz Turks
East side: Capture of 23 cities and plan to counterattack against a possible alliance of the neighbors (Tang, Onoq and Yenisei Kirghiz)
North side: Defeat of Yenisei Kirghiz (north) and campaign to Turgesh (Onoq territory, west)

=== 2nd stele (27 lines) ===
West side: Battle of Bolchu (711) against Turgesh and annexation of Onoq territory (roughly present Turkestan)
South side: Annexation of Temir Kapig, Ilterish Qaghan’s 7 campaigns to Khitan people (east), 17 campaigns to Tang dynasty (south), 5 campaigns to Oghuz Turks
East side: (Tonyukuk praises himself on his valuable assistance to khagans and adds that he gets old)
North side: (Epilogue) After the victories, Turks and the Turkic Sir (people) live happily.

== See also ==
- Göktürks
- Tariat inscriptions
