= Kul Tigin =

Prince and military commander of the Second Turkic Khaganate

Kül Tegin
- Kültegin; Old Turkic: 𐰚𐰇𐰠𐱅𐰃𐰏𐰤
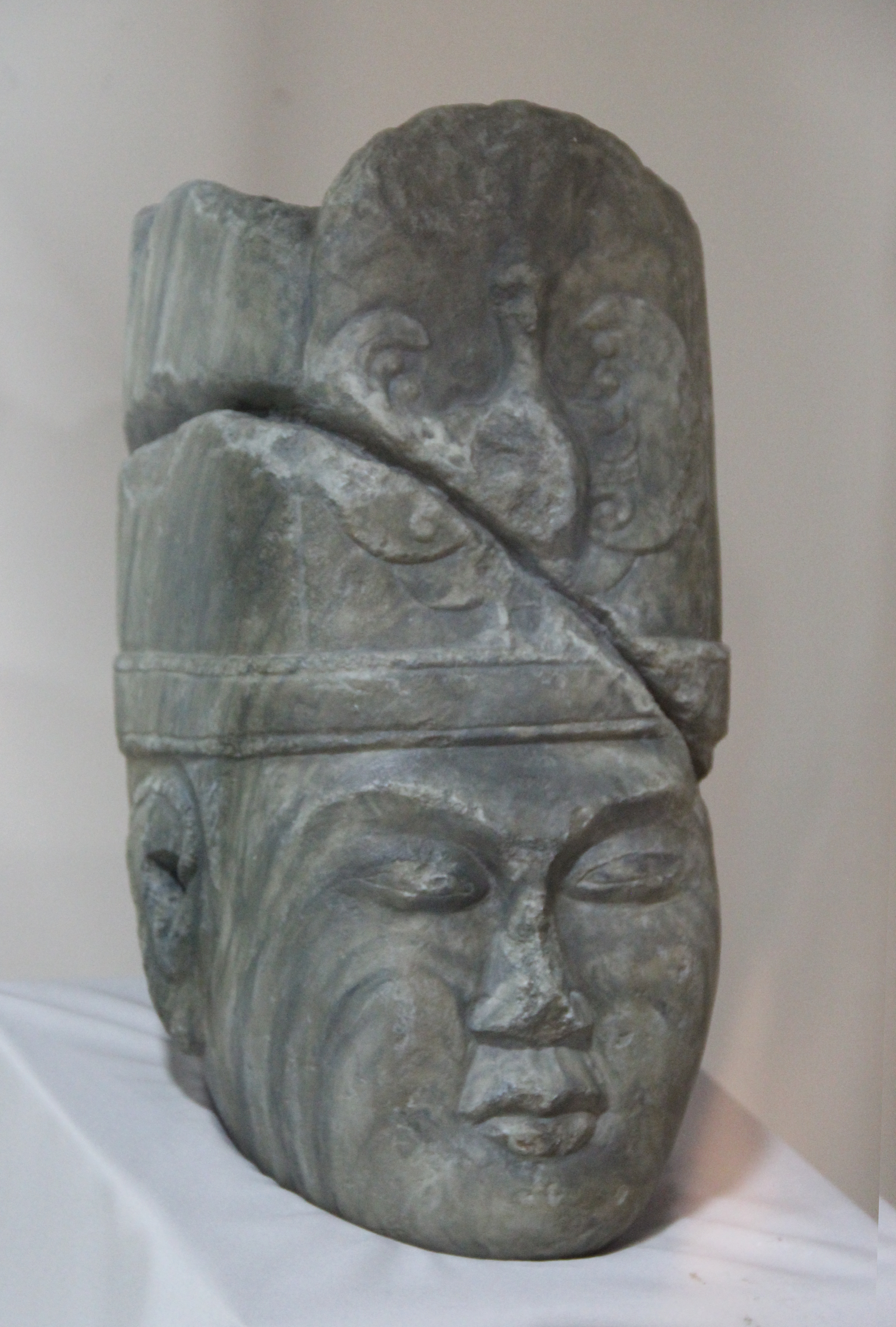
- Bust of Kul Tigin found at the Khoshoo Tsaidam burial site, in Khashaat, Arkhangai Province, Orkhon River valley. Located in the National Museum of Mongolia.
- Born: 684
- Died: February 27, 731 (aged 46–47)
- Relatives: Ilterish Qaghan (father); El Bilga Khatun (mother); Bilge Khagan (brother)
- Military career
- Allegiance: Second Turkic Khaganate
- Rank: Tarkhan (posthumously)
- Conflicts: Battle of Bolchu; Sogdian Campaign; Battle of Iduk Bash; Battle of Ming Sha; Battle of Sayan Mountains; Battle of Samarkand (712); Transoxiana Campaign; Battle of Tashkent (713); Battle of Aksu (717)
- Memorials: Orkhon inscriptions

Kul Tigin (Old Turkic: 𐰚𐰇𐰠𐱅𐰃𐰏𐰤, romanized: Kültegin Chinese: 闕特勤, (Note: erroneously 阙特勒 Quètèlè) Pinyin: Quètèqín, Wade–Giles: chüeh-t'e-ch'in, 684–731) was a general and a prince of the Second Turkic Khaganate.

== Etymology ==
Necip Asım (1921) initially gave his name as köl, based on the etymology of Mahmud al-Kashgari, meaning "lake, sea". Radloff rendered this word as kül, and Thomsen (1896), Malov (1951) and Tekin (1968) adopted this reading. Bazin (1956) and Hamilton (1962) rejected Radloff's reading and preferred the form köl. However, Chinese sources used the Chinese character 闕 (què). Therefore, this word should be read as kül, not köl.

== Biography ==
=== Early years ===
Kul Tigin was the second son of Ilterish Qaghan, the Second Turkic Khaganate's founder, and the younger brother of Bilge Qaghan (born Ashina Mojilian), the fourth qaghan. He was seven when his father died.

During the reign of Qapaghan Qaghan, Kul Tigin and his older brother earned reputation for their military prowess. They defeated the Yenisei Kyrgyz, Türgesh, and Karluks, extending the kaganate territory to the Iron Gate south of Samarkand. They also subjugated all nine of the Toquz Oghuz tribes.

In 705, Turkic forces commanded by Ashina Mojilian entered Lingwu, defeating Shazha Chongyi (沙吒忠义). Kul Tigin commanded a unit in battle, in which he lost three horses.

In 711, he participated in Battle of Bolchu, which was disastrous for the Türgesh.

In 712, the Arab general Qutayba ibn Muslim besieged Samarkand after capturing Khwarazm. The prince of Samarkand appealed to the king of Tashkent for aid. Qapaghan Qaghan, who had become overlord of both Tashkent and Ferghana, dispatched Kul Tegin at the head of a combined army of Eastern turks, Tashkent forces, and Ferghana troops to relieve the besieged city. Despite the strength of the Turkish forces, Qutayba ultimately defeated Kul Tegin's army, forcing the Turks to withdraw and allowing the Umayyads to enter Samarkand and establish a garrison there.

In 713 he participated in subjugation of Karluk tribes with his brother and uncle.

=== As supreme commander ===
Upon the death of Qapaghan Qaghan, his son Inel Qaghan attempted to illegally ascend to the throne, defying the traditional lateral succession, but Kül Tigin refused to recognize the takeover. He raised an army, attacked, and killed Inel, Ashina Duoxifu and his trusted followers. He placed Mojilian on the throne as Bilge Qaghan, and took the title of shad, an equivalent of commander-in-chief of the army, for himself.

=== Death ===
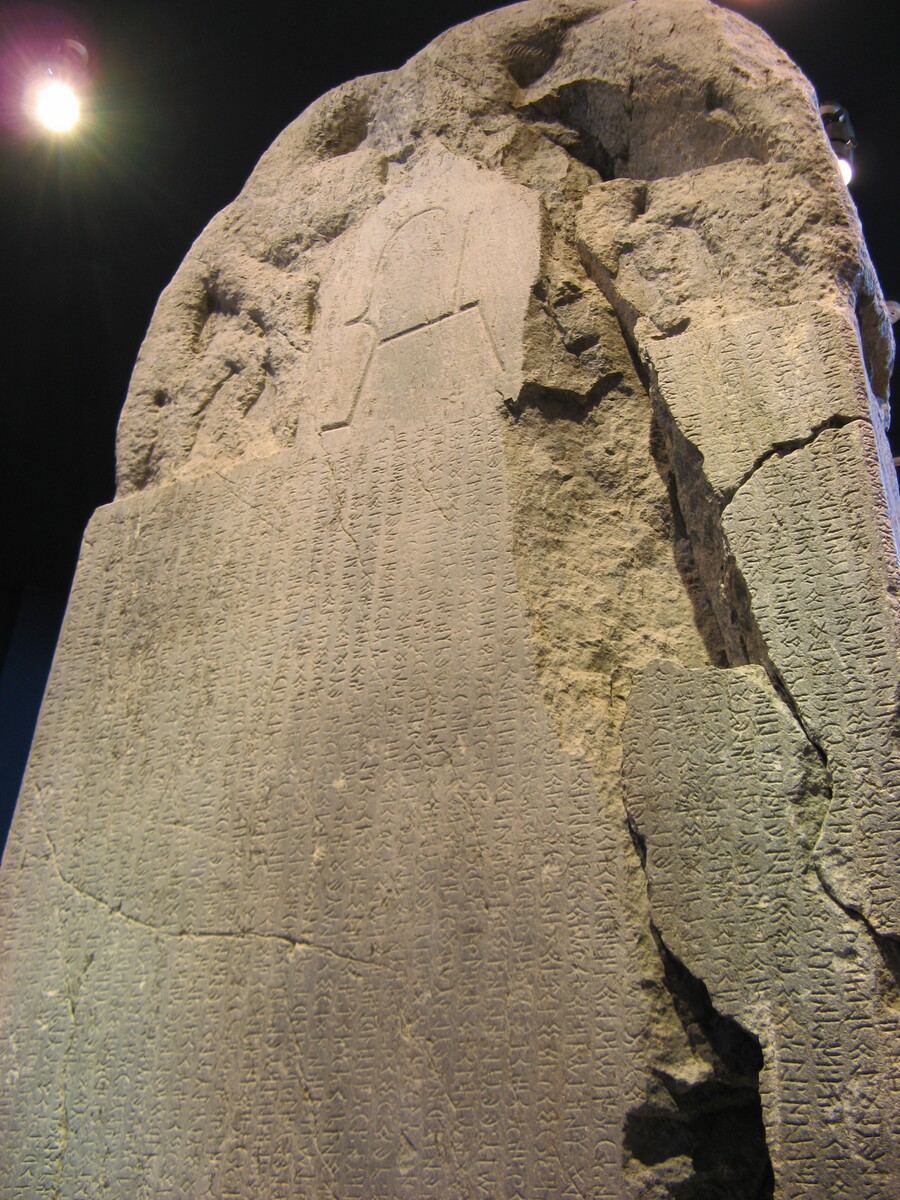
Kul Tigin stele.

He died suddenly on 27 February 731. A stele in his memory, which included inscriptions in both Turkic and Chinese, was erected at his memorial complex of Khoshoo Tsaidam, at the present site of the Orkhon inscriptions. Kül-Tegin is also mentioned in the inscription erected in memory of his older brother Bilge Qaghan at the neighbouring site of Khöshöö-Tsaidam-1.

Heavenly Divine Türk Bilgä Qaghan, I reign at this time.
Hear out my words, all my brothers, my sons, and also you, my tribe, my people:
Šad Pït lords of the south;
Tarqan Buyruq lords of the north;
Otuz . . .;

His burial ceremony took place in 1 November 731. He was posthumously renamed Inanču Apa Yarğan Tarqan (Old Turkic: 𐰃𐰤𐰨𐰆:𐰯𐰀:𐰖𐰺𐰍𐰣:𐱃𐰺𐰴𐰣) by Bilge Qaghan.

The head of the Kül Tigin sculpture in the Khöshöö-Tsaidam enclave in (Orkhon, in northern Mongolia) carries a bird with wings spread like an eagle, personifying a raven. The head was found by the Czech archeologist Lumir Jisl during his 1957–1958 expedition to Mongolia.

== Popular culture ==
He was portrayed by Ham Suk Hun (함석훈) in Korean TV Series Dae Jo-yeong.

== Sources ==
- Kamola, Stefan (2023), I Made Him Praiseworthy: The Kül Tegin Inscription in World History, De Gruyter
- Talat Tekin, A Grammar of Orkhon Turkic. Indiana University Uralic and Altaic Series, vol. 69 (Bloomington/The Hague: Mouton, 1968)
- 新疆维吾尔自治区民族事务委員会、新疆民族辞典， 乌鲁木齐：Xinjiang People's Press，1995 [Xinjiang Uygur Autonomous District Minority People's Committee, Encyclopedic Dictionary of the Xinjiang Minority Peoples, Ürümqi: Xinjiang People's Publishing Company, 1955]
