= Second Turkic Khaganate =

682–744 khaganate founded by the Göktürks

Second Turkic Khaganate 𐱅𐰇𐰼𐰜:𐰃𐰠 Türük el
- 682–744
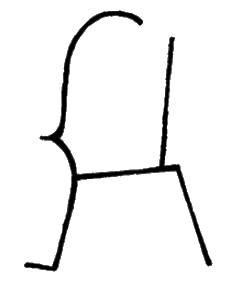
- Tamga of Ashina tribe

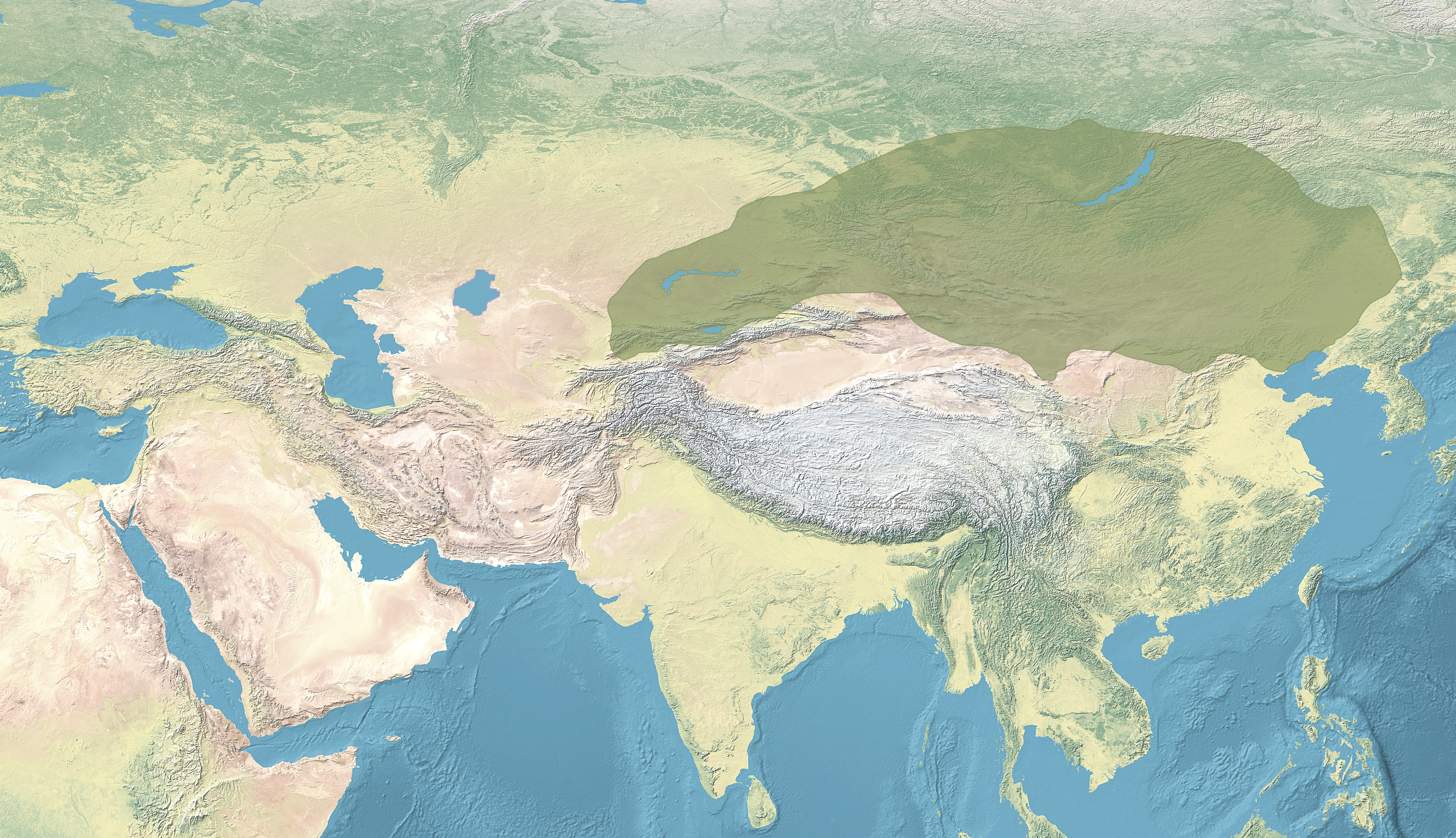
- Approximate map of the Second Turkic Khaganate, 720 AD.
- Status: Khaganate (Nomadic empire)
- Capital: Otuken (summer camp); Yarγan yurtï (winter camp)
- Common languages: Old Turkic (official)
- Religion: Tengrism (official)
- Government: Hereditary monarchy
- Khagan
  - 682–691: Elteriš Qaghan
  - 691–716: Qapγan Qaghan
  - 716: İnäl Qaghan
  - 716–734: Bilgä Qaghan
  - 744: Ozmıš Qaghan
- Tarkhan
  - 682–716: Tonyukuk
  - 716–731: Kul Tigin
- Legislature: Kurultay
- History
  - Established: 682
  - Disestablished: 744
Preceded by
| Western Turkic Khaganate |
| Eastern Turkic Khaganate |
| Tang dynasty |
| Xueyantuo |
Succeeded by
| Uyghur Khaganate |
| Yenisei Kyrgyz Khaganate |
| Türgesh |

The Second Turkic Khaganate (Note: Old Turkic: 𐱅𐰇𐰼𐰜:𐰃𐰠, romanized: Türük el, lit. 'State of the Turks' · Chinese: 後突厥; pinyin: Hòu Tūjué, known as Turk Bilge Qaghan country (Old Turkic: 𐱅𐰇𐰼𐰝:𐰋𐰃𐰠𐰏𐰀:𐰴𐰍𐰣:𐰃𐰠𐰭𐰀, romanized: Türük Bilgä Qağan eli) in Tonyukuk inscriptions) was a khaganate in Central and Eastern Asia founded by Ilterish of the Ashina clan of the Göktürks and lasted from 682 to 744. It was preceded by the Eastern Turkic Khaganate (552–630) and the early Tang dynasty period (630–682). The Second Khaganate was centered on Ötüken in the upper reaches of the Orkhon River. It was succeeded by its subject Toquz Oghuz confederation, which became the Uyghur Khaganate.

== History ==
=== Origin ===
==== Tang conquest of the Eastern Turks ====
After the Tang dynasty defeated the Eastern Turkic Khaganate in 630, the surrendered Turkic tribal chiefs and their people were organized into six prefectures under four area commands in the Ordos Loop (Guannei Circuit). Some of these were loose rein prefectures which retained their traditional tribal structure while others closer to Tang garrisons were directly governed by officials appointed by the Tang court. Later, protectorates were created in major military garrisons to oversee larger and more remote tribes. The Yanran Protectorate was created in 630 or 647 north of Wuyuan and west of Baotou to oversee the Ordos Loop. The Yanran Protectorate was renamed Hanhai Protectorate in 663 and renamed again to Anbei Protectorate (Protectorate General to Pacify the North) in 669. The Yunzhong Protectorate was created and renamed to the Chanyu Protectorate in 664, located northwest of Horinger and south of Hohhot.

==== Rebellions ====
In 679, the Turk officials Ashide Wenfu and Ashide Fengzhi rebelled against the Chanyu Protectorate and backed Ashina Nishufu as their khagan. The Turk chiefs of 24 border districts joined them. Chief Administrator Xiao Siye of the Chanyu Protectorate, together with Hua Dazhi and Li Jingjia, were sent to combat the rebels. They won a battle but extended too far and were accosted by a snowstorm. Their camp was caught in a surprise attack by the Turks at night, forcing Xiao to retreat due to the loss of supplies and men. The next Tang general, Pei Xingjian, arrived at Shuo Prefecture and hid his soldiers in 300 supply carts while ordering the weak soldiers to escort the carts and lure the Turks into a trap. When the Turks took the bait and attacked the escorts, the hidden Tang troops ambushed them and forced them to retreat. The fleeing Turk troops were caught by Tang soldiers deployed in strategic locations. In the spring of 680, Pei Xingjian defeated Fengzhi's army at Heishan ("Black Mountain") and captured him. Nishufu was killed by his subordinate and his head was sent to the Tang emperor. The remaining Turk rebels continued to attack the Tang throughout 680 and 681.

Ashina Funian, a relative of Illig Khagan, the last ruler of the Eastern Turkic Khaganate, proclaimed himself khagan in Xià Prefecture and united the forces of Ashide Wenfu. Pei Xingjian was appointed to campaign against the Turks again on 16 February 681. The vice commander, Cao Huaishun, was sent as a vanguard to attack the Turks but he failed to find the enemy before exhausting his troops. When he finally caught Wenfu to the north of the Great Wall, a minor clash occurred before the two sides disengaged. Meanwhile, Funian had kidnapped Cao's wife, children, and captured his supplies. On 9 June 681, Cao attacked Funian without success. The next day, Funian took advantage of change in wind and routed Cao's forces. However, when the Turk khagan returned to camp, he found that his wife and children had been kidnapped by Tang forces led by Cheng Wuting. Cheng led the forces stationed in Chanyu Protectorate to attack Funian while the Uyghurs and Toquz Oghuz tribes attacked Funian from the north. Funian and Wenfu surrendered to Pei Xingjian on 16 November 681. They were sent to Chang'an where they were beheaded in the marketplace along with 52 other Turk leaders. Tonyukuk and Bilge Qaghan blamed the failed uprising on the Turks for being disloyal and surrendering to the Tang. When they surrendered to the Tang emperor again, he was irritated by their revolt and threatened to kill all the Turks.

In the Orkhon inscriptions, Bilge Qaghan blamed the Chinese for sowing discord within the Turks and enslaving them:

"Because of want of harmony between the begs and the people, and because of the Chinese people's cunning and craft and its intrigues, and because the younger and the elder brothers chose to take counsel against one another and bring discord between begs and people, they brought the old realm of the Turkic people to dissolution, and brought destruction on its lawful kagans. The sons of the nobles became the bondsmen of the Chinese people, their unsullied daughters became its slaves. The Turkic begs gave up their Turkic names, and bearing the Chinese names of Chinese begs they obeyed the Chinese Emperor, and served him during fifty years. For him they waged war in the East towards the sun's rising, as far as Bokli kagan, in the West they made expeditions as far as Taimirkapig; for the Chinese Emperor they conquered kingdoms and power. The whole of the common Turkic people said thus: 'I have been a nation that had its own kingdom; where is now my kingdom? For whom do I win the kingdoms? said they. I have been a people that had its own kagan; where is my kagan? Which kagan is it I serve?'".

=== Ilterish ===
After the failures of the previous Turk leaders, a number of tribal leaders left for Ötüken in Mongolia, including Qutlugh (later Ilterish Qaghan), a grandson of Illig Qaghan. Qutlugh's father was a chief who served under Sheli Yuanying, the military governor of the Yunzhong Protectorate. The Tonyukuk inscriptions state that his father bore the title of Guduolu xiejin (Qutluq Irkin), so it is possible that the name Qutlugh was actually a title inherited from his father. He was called a shad, a special title for military commanders, in his early years. Originally, he only had 17 followers, but as news of his rebellion spread, his following increased to 70 people. After a number of campaigns, the number of his soldiers increased to 700. The number of troops recorded may be due to the importance of the number seven, which is considered a mysterious number, rather than reflective of actual troop numbers. Chinese sources state that the number of rebels following Qutlugh was more than 5,000. Qutlugh was named Ilterish Qaghan in 680. Within ten years, he had mounted 47 campaigns and fought 20 battles, uniting the steppes and engaging in raids on the Tang dynasty.

The primary targets of Qutlugh's forces were the Toquz Oghuz and the Tang. They first plundered the Toquz Oghuz for sheep and horses, after which Qutlugh proclaimed himself Ilterish Qaghan. He appointed his younger brother Mochuo (later Qapaghan Qaghan) as shad and another brother Duoxifu as yabghu.

During the rise of Ilterish, he was aided by a defector from the Tang named Ashide Yuanzhen. Yuanzhen was originally in charge of a group of surrendered Turks in the Chanyu Protectorate but he was arrested for his involvement in criminal affairs. When Ilterish came to plunder, Yuanzhen defected to Ilterish and was put in charge of military affairs. He participated in many of Ilterish's campaigns, particularly against the Turgesh. While the army was returning from the Kyrgyz, Ilterish had to leave because his wife had died. His generals could not come to an agreement as to whether they should continue the campaigning against the Turgesh. Tonyukuk wanted to keep campaigning while Apa Tarkan and Bögü Kağan were against the idea. Apa Tarkan was the title held by Yuanzhen, who died during the campaign against the Turgesh. There are some theories that Yuanzhen and Tonyukuk are the same person.

Ilterish began attacking Tang border regions on 12 July 682 by plundering Lan Prefecture and killing its prefect, Wang Demao. Half a year later, due to the poor climate in their mountain area where they lived, the Turks began plundering the northern borders of Bing Prefecture. In response to these attacks, the military general Xue Rengui was assigned to defend the Yun Prefecture against Turkic aggression. This culminated in a battle between the two forces where the Turks were defeated and suffered tens of thousands of losses in soldiers and animals. However, the Turkic forces resumed their attacks in March 683 and plundered Ding and Gui prefectures. The following month the Turks besieged the Chanyu Protectorate and killed its adjutant, Zhang Xingshi. The prefect of the Yu Prefecture – Li Sijian – was also killed following an attack in the region by the Turks.

The military governor of the Feng Prefecture, Cui Zhibian, led an expedition against the Turks. However, this resulted in Cui Zhibian's capture by the Turks. As a result of these defeats, the Tang court considered abandoning the Feng Prefecture and relocating its residents. This plan was shelved due to opposition from the adjutant of Feng Prefecture, Tang Xiujing. Between June and July 683, the Turks began attacking Lan Prefecture which resulted in a defeat at the hands of the assistant general Yang Xuanji who routed the invading army. However, due to the incessant attacks on the prefecture, Emperor Gaozong and the Tang court decided to downgrade the region to a lesser military institution. On 8 December 683, the commander Cheng Wuting led an expedition against the Turkic headquarters.

Turk forces started to invade the territory of the Toquz Oghuz in 684. A fugitive from the Toquz Oghuz brought news to Ilterish that their new qaghan, Baz Qaghan (Yaoluoge Dujiezhi), had sent letters to the Tang and the Khitans to form an alliance against the Turks. The adviser Tonyukuk advised Ilterish to attack the Toquz Oghuz first. Ilterish led his soldiers into Ötüken and defeated a force of 3,000 Toquz Oghuz warriors. Following the conquest of Ötüken in 685, the Turks instigated the Toquz Oghuz to rebel against the Tang. The Tang sent 30,000 On oq under general Tian yangming to attack the Toquz Oghuz. The On oq troops carried out their orders to a degree that the Tang court did not expect and crushed the enemy tribes. The seat of the Anbei Protectorate was moved to Tongcheng (southeast of Ejin Banner) to administer the surrendered Toquz Oghuz. While the Uyghur component of the Toquz Oghuz had been defeated, the Tongra and Pugu tribes continued to rebel. General Liu Jingtong was dispatched with cavalry forces in the summer of 686 to suppress the remaining rebels. More than 10,000 Toquz Oghuz surrendered at Tongcheng due to a severe drought in their homeland that lasted for three years, killing up to 80 percent of their livestock. A large number of Toquz Oghuz moved to the Hexi Corridor under Tang control.

=== Qapaghan ===
Ilterish died in 692 and was succeeded by his brother, Qapaghan Qaghan, who continued to expand the Second Turkic Khaganate to incorporate more tribes.

In 696–697 Qapaghan subjugated the Khitans and sealed an alliance with the Kumo Xi (Tatabï in Turkic texts), which stemmed the advance of the Tang armies to the northeast, into the foothills of the Khingan, and secured the empire's eastern frontier. Between 698 and 701 the northern and western frontiers of Qapaghan's state were defined by the Tannu Ola, Altai and Tarbagatai mountain ranges. After defeating the Bayirku tribe in 706–707, the Türks occupied lands extending from the upper reaches of the Kerulen to Lake Baikal. In 709–710 the Türk forces subjugated the Az and the Chik, crossed the Sayan Mountains, and inflicted a crushing defeat on the Yenisei Kyrgyz. The Kyrgyz ruler, Bars beg, fell in battle, and his descendants were to remain vassals of the Göktürks for several generations. In 711 the Türk forces, led by Tonyukuk, crossed the Altai Mountains, defeated the Türgesh army in Dzungaria on the River Boluchu. Tonyukuk forced a crossing over the Syr Darya in pursuit of the retreating Türgesh, leading his troops to the border of Tokharistan. However, in battles with the Arabs near Samarkand the Türk forces were cut off from their rear services and suffered considerable losses; they had difficulty in returning to the Altai in 713–714. There they reinforced the army that was preparing to besiege Beshbalik. The siege was unsuccessful and, after losing in six skirmishes, the Türks lifted it.

=== Raids on the Tang dynasty ===
Qapaghan raided the Tang in 693 until the Khitans broke away from the Turks, after which he proposed an alliance with the Tang against the Khitans. He defeated the Khitans in 696 and continued to mount raids on the Tang in the same year. The Turks continued to raid the Tang dynasty in 698, 702, and 706, bringing them many captives and immense wealth. After 706, the number of raids on the Tang decreased. According to Thomas Barfield, this was because the Turks' main motive in raiding China was to extract wealth rather than conquest, and despite political weakness at the Tang court, the Turks' focus had shifted to the west after imposing favorable demands on the Tang.

According to Jonathan Karam Skaff, both the cause and cessation of raids by the Turks were due to the state of Tang border defenses. After Qapaghan had defeated the Khitans, he used their territory as a staging ground for massive raids on the Tang. The decline in raids was due to the re-establishment of previously neglected frontier garrisons along the Yellow River north of the Ordos Plateau. Wu Zetian appointed a new general, Xue Na, who halted the raids from 698 to 712 by improving frontier defenses. In 709, Emperor Zhongzong of Tang re-established major garrisons at the cities of Western Shouxiang, Middle Shouxiang, and Eastern Shouxiang along the north of the Yellow River. After 709, Qapaghan and Bilge Qaghan were limited to campaigns primarily against other nomadic tribes, causing dissatisfaction among their people that led to Qapaghan's assassination in 715.

=== Crisis ===
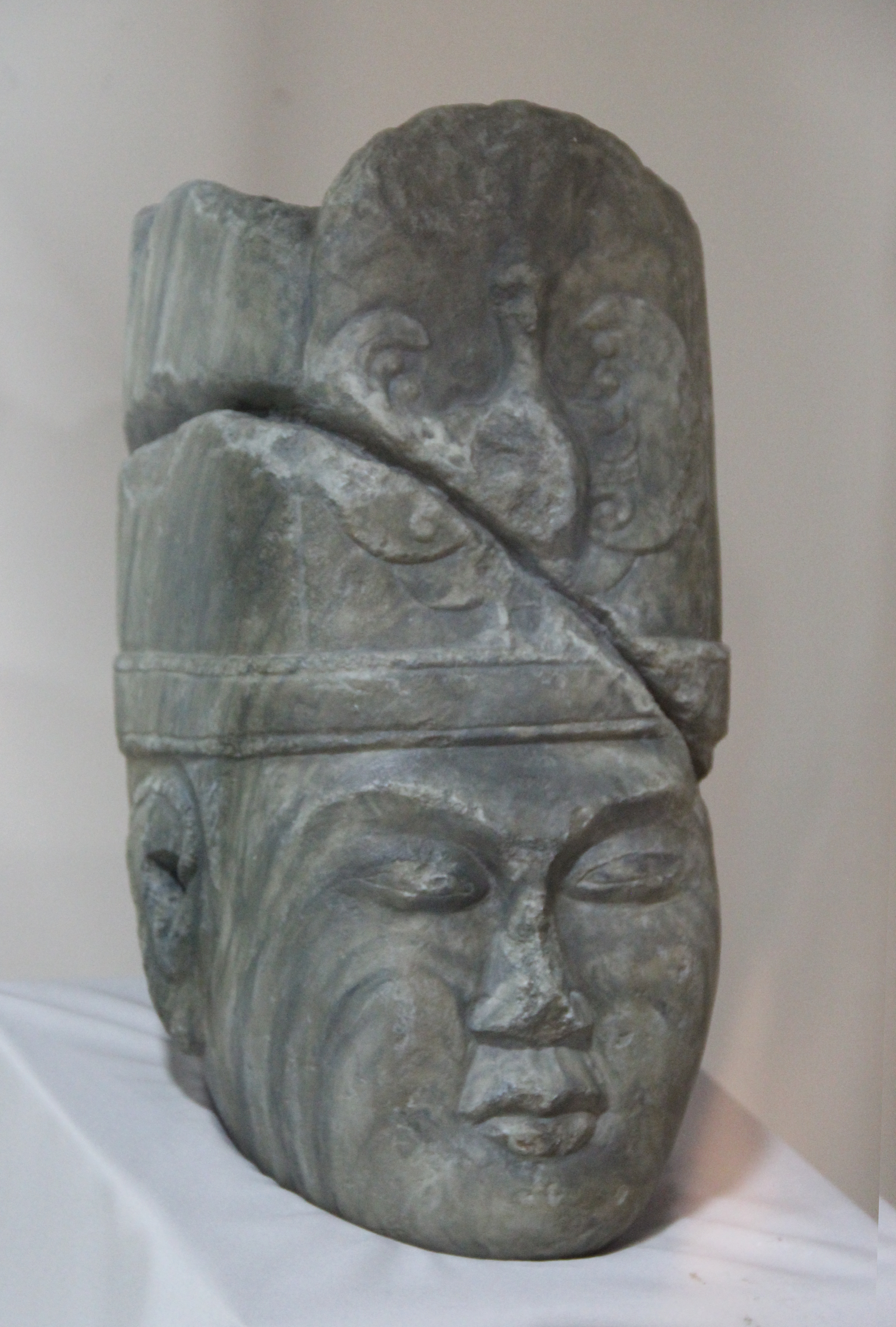
Bust of Kul Tigin (AD 684–731), prince of the Second Turkic Khaganate, found in Khashaat, Arkhangai Province, Orkhon River valley. Located in the National Museum of Mongolia.

After Qapaghan's death, the empire erupted in civil war between the lineages of Qapaghan led by Inel Qaghan and Ilterish led by Kul Tigin. Kul Tigin, the son of Ilterish Qaghan, defeated Qapaghan's sons and killed all members of their lineage as well as Qapaghan's advisors with the exception of Tonyukuk. Kul Tigin enthroned his elder brother as Bilge Qaghan and together they spent most of their time re-conquering tribes that had broken away during the war. In 620, the Turks attacked the Tang and extracted a yearly tributary payment of 100,000 balls of silk as part of the peace negotiations. Bilge was assassinated in 734 and power passed to his son, Yollıg Khagan. Yollıg died within a year and his brother, Tengri Qaghan, succeeded him. Tengri was a young boy at the time and the empire entered a regency under his mother, Qutluğ Säbäg Qatun, who was a daughter of Tonyukuk. Tengri's uncles split the empire among themselves until Tengri was assassinated in 741. An alliance of former subject tribes including the Basmyls, Karluks, and Uyghurs destroyed the Second Turkic Khaganate in 744. In the aftermath, the Uyghurs defeated their allies and founded the Uyghur Khaganate ruled by the Yaoluoge clan.

=== Fall ===
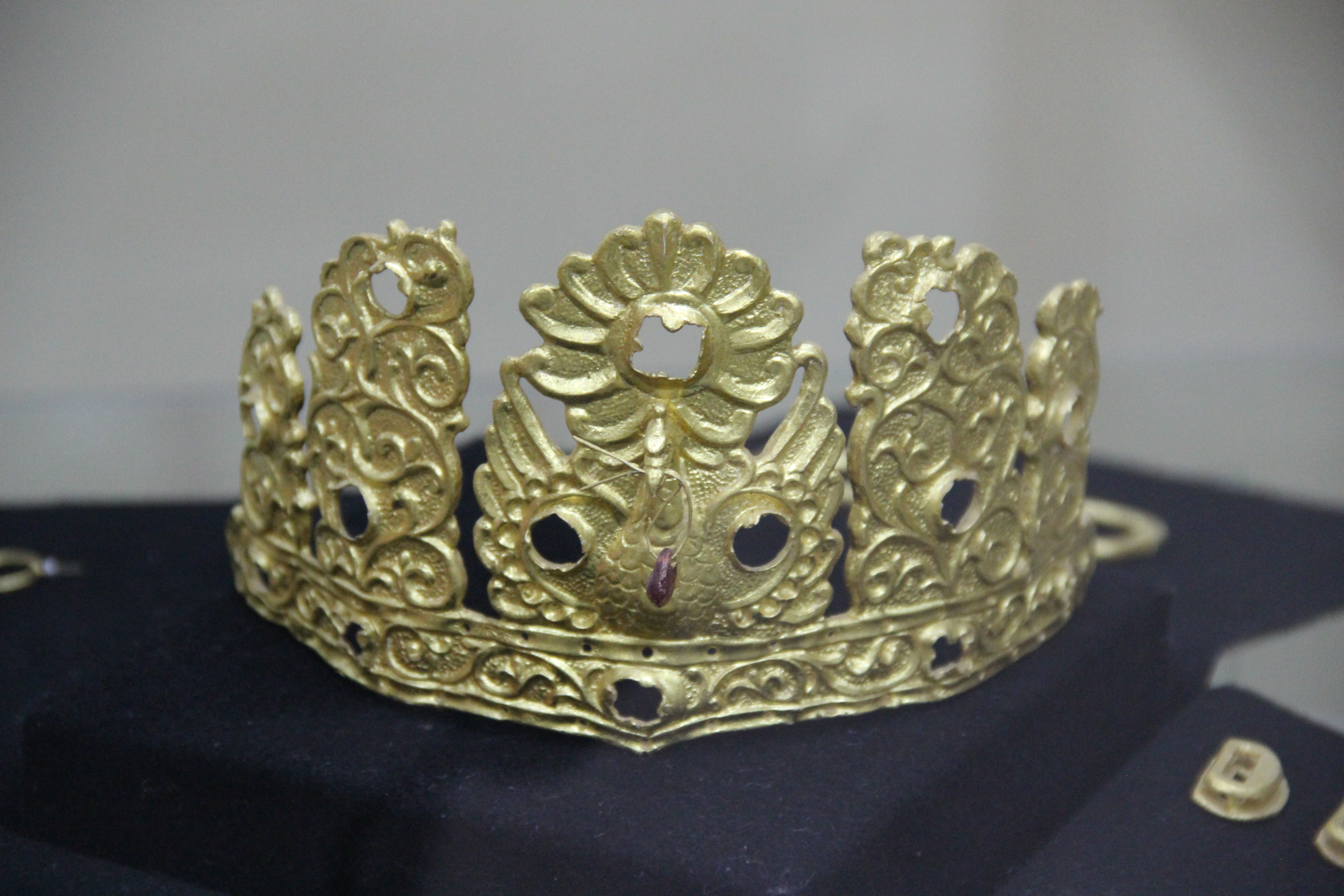
Golden Crown of Bilge Qaghan from the burial site at Khoshoo Tsaidam.

Kutlug I Bilge Khagan of Uyghurs allied himself with the Karluks and Basmyls. In 744 Kutlug seized Ötüken and beheaded the last Göktürk qaghan, Ozmish Qaghan. His head was sent to the Tang court. In the span of a few years, the Uyghurs gained mastery of Inner Asia and established the Uyghur Khaganate. Kulun Beg succeeded his father Ozmish. The Tang emperor Xuanzong decided to destroy the last traces of the Turkic Khaganate and sent general Wang Zhongsi to Kulun's forces. Meanwhile, Ashina Shi was deposed by Kutlug. Wang Zhongsi defeated the eastern flank of the Turkic army headed by Apa Tarkhan. Although Kulun Beg tried to escape, he was arrested by the Uyghurs and was beheaded in 745. Most of the Türks fled to other Turkic tribes like the Basmyl. However, a group including Qutluğ Säbäg Qatun, Bilge Khagan's widow, and Tonyukuk's daughter, took refuge in the Tang dynasty. The Tang emperor legitimised her as a princess and she was appointed as the ruler of her people.

== Political and social structure ==
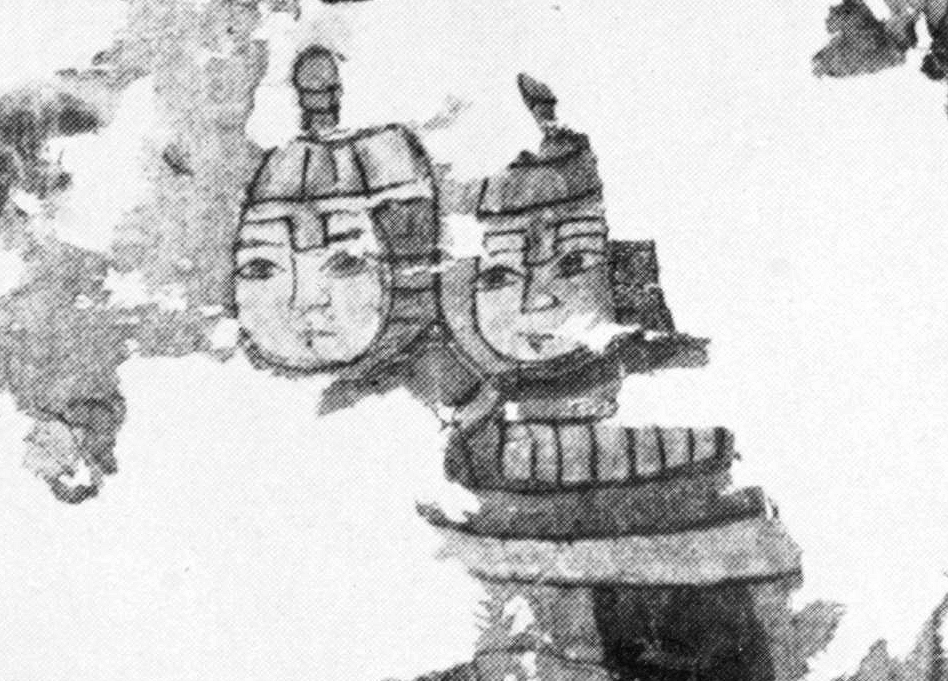
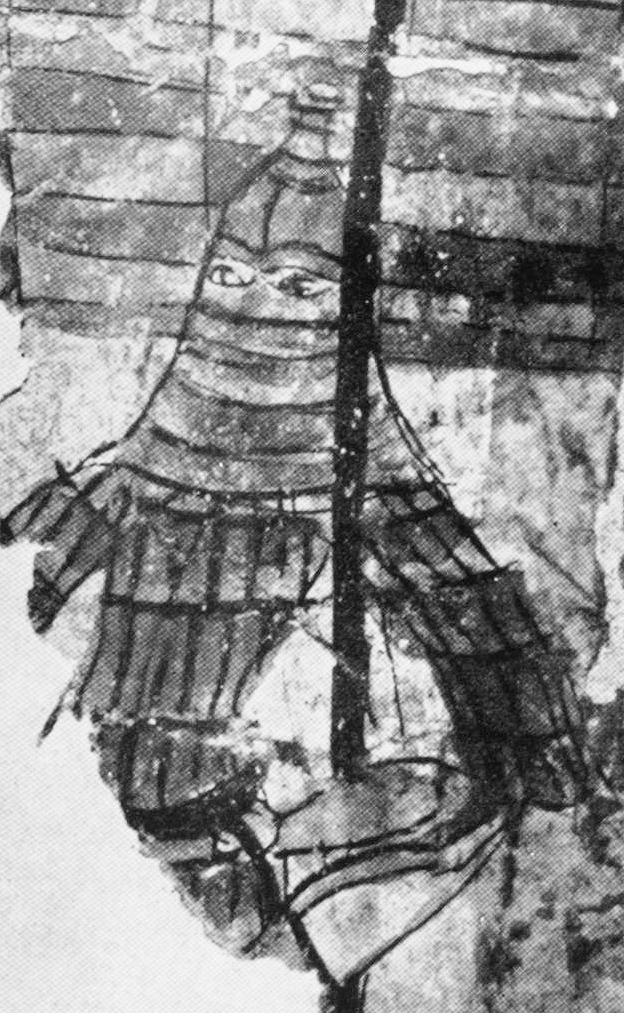
Painted silk fragments of men in armour, from a Manichaean Temple near Qocho. Turkic, 8th century or 9th century. Museum für Asiatische Kunst, Berlin.

Under Ilterish, the traditional structure of the Turkic state was restored. The empire created by Ilterish and his successors was a territorial union of ethnically related and hierarchically co-ordinated tribes and tribal groups. They were ideologically linked by common beliefs and accepted genealogies, and politically united by a single military and administrative organisation (el) and by general legal norms (törü). The tribal organisation (bodun) and the political structure (el) complemented one another, defining the strength and durability of social ties. In the words of the Türk inscriptions, the khan controlled the state and was head of the tribal group (el tutup bodunïm bašladïm). The principal group in the empire was composed of twelve Turkic tribes headed by the dynastic tribe of the Ashina.

=== Economy ===
The basis of the Türk economy was nomadic cattle-raising. Organised hunting in the steppes and mountains was of military as well as economic significance: during these hunts, the warriors were trained and the various detachments were coordinated. A Chinese chronicler describes the economy and way of life of the Türks thus: "They live in felt tents and wander following the water and the grass". Horses were of vital importance to the Türks. Although the economy rested on cattle-raising, winter feed for livestock was not stored. The advantage of the horse was that it could be at grass all year round, feeding even under a light cover of snow. Sheep and goats followed the horses, eating the grass that they themselves would have been unable to clear of snow. Bulls, yaks and camels are also frequently mentioned in Türk texts as valuable livestock.

=== Religion ===
Tengrism was the official religion of the Second Turkic Khaganate. Khagans believed that ruling Ashina family gained legitimacy "through its support from Tengri". Chinese sources state that Bilge wanted to convert to Buddhism and establish cities and temples. However, Tonyukuk discouraged him from this by pointing out that their nomadic lifestyle was what made them a greater military power when compared to Tang dynasty. While Türks' power rested on their mobility, conversion to Buddhism would bring pacifism among the population. Therefore, sticking to Tengriism was necessary to survive.

== Foreign relations ==
=== Tang dynasty ===
==== Orkhon inscription ====
While I have ruled here, I have become reconciled with the Chinese people. The Chinese people, who give in abundance gold, silver, millet, and silk, have always used ingratiating words and have at their disposal enervating riches. While ensnaring them with their ingratiating talk and enervating riches, they have drawn the far-dwelling peoples nearer to themselves. But after settling down near them, we have come to see their cunning.

=== Sogdia ===
Camels, women, girls, silver, and gold were seized from Sogdia during a raid by Qapaghan Qaghan.

==== Tonyukuk inscriptions ====
𐰦𐰀:𐰘𐰼𐰝𐰃:𐰽𐰀:𐰉𐰽𐰞𐰍𐰺𐰆:𐰺𐰑𐰴:𐰉𐰆𐰑𐰣:𐰸𐰆𐰯:𐰚𐰠𐱅𐰃:𐰆𐰞:𐰚𐰇𐰤𐱅𐰀:𐱅𐰏𐱅𐰃:𐱅𐰇𐰼𐰝:𐰉𐰆𐰑𐰣:𐱅𐰢𐰼:𐰴𐰯𐰍𐰴𐰀:𐱅𐰃𐰤𐰾𐰃:𐰆𐰍𐰞

Anta berüki As-oq baslïγaru Soγdaq budun qop kelti jükünti ...tegti Türük budun Temir Qapïγqa Tensi oγulï.

The whole Sogdian people, led by Asuk, came and obeyed. Those days, the Turkish people reached the Iron Gates.

== Works of art and artifacts ==
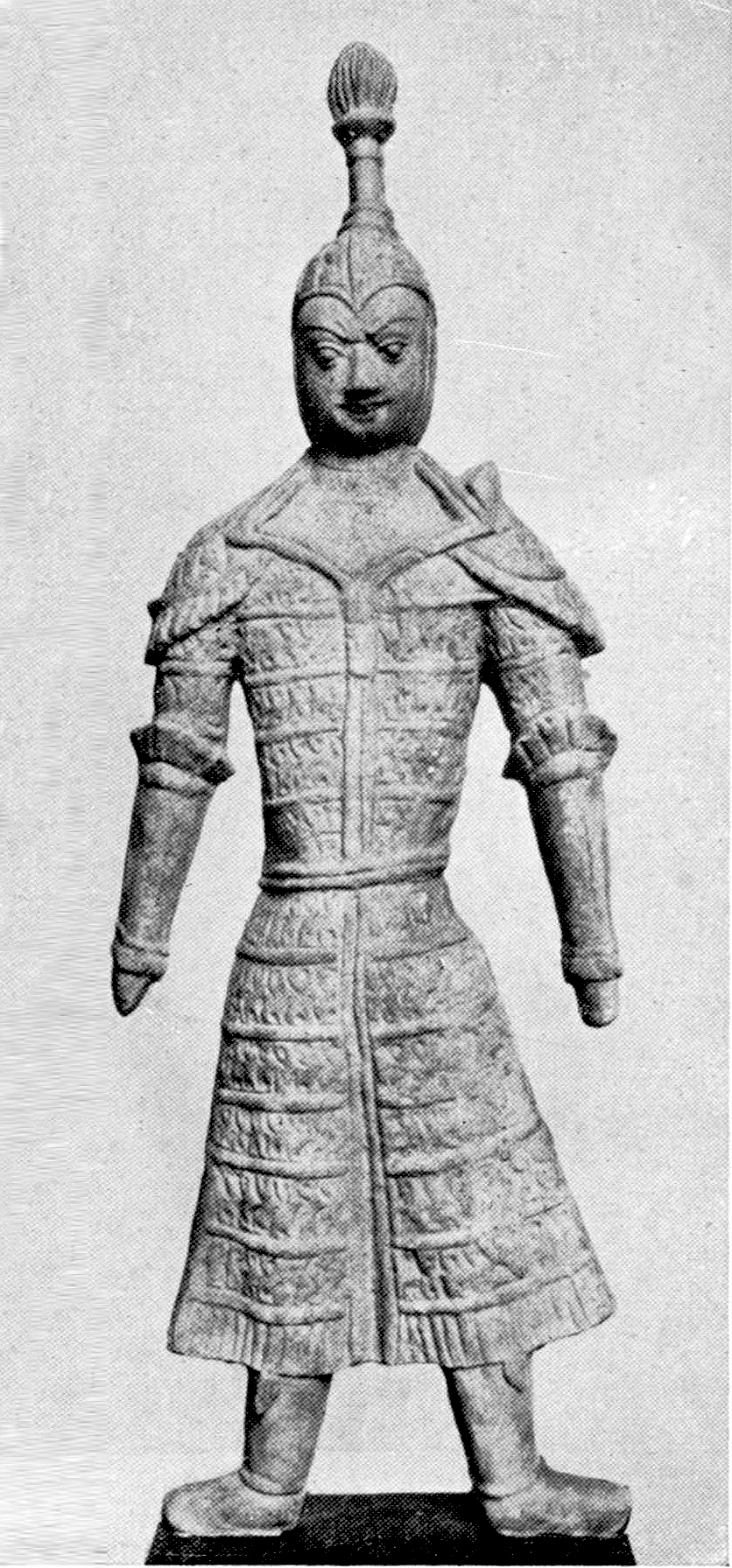
Türk soldier in armour, Shorchuk, Xinjiang, 8th century CE.

Numerous artefacts of gold and silver are known from the graves of the rulers of the Second Turkic Khaganate.

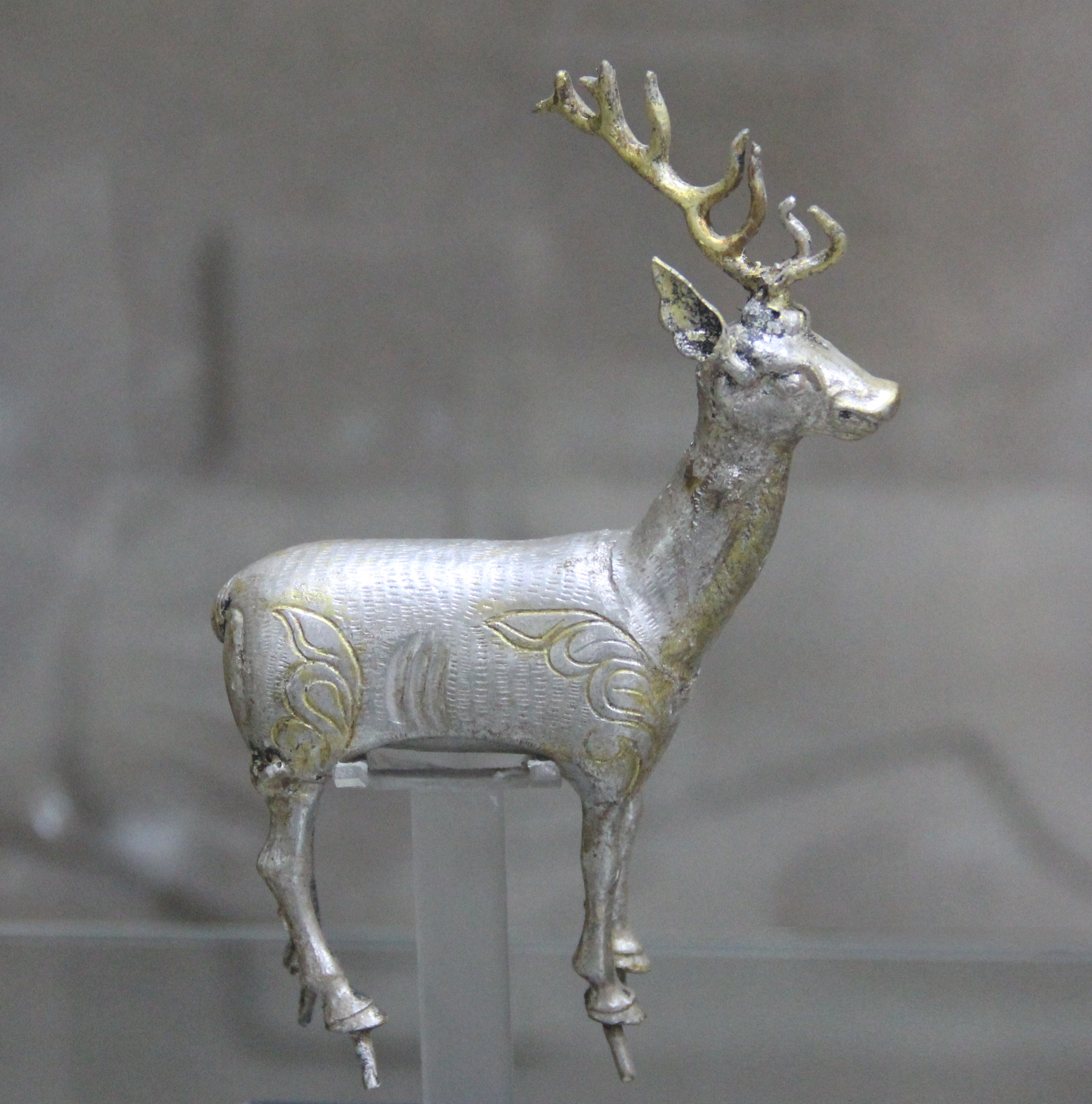
Silver Deer of Bilge Qaghan from the burial site at Khoshoo Tsaidam.

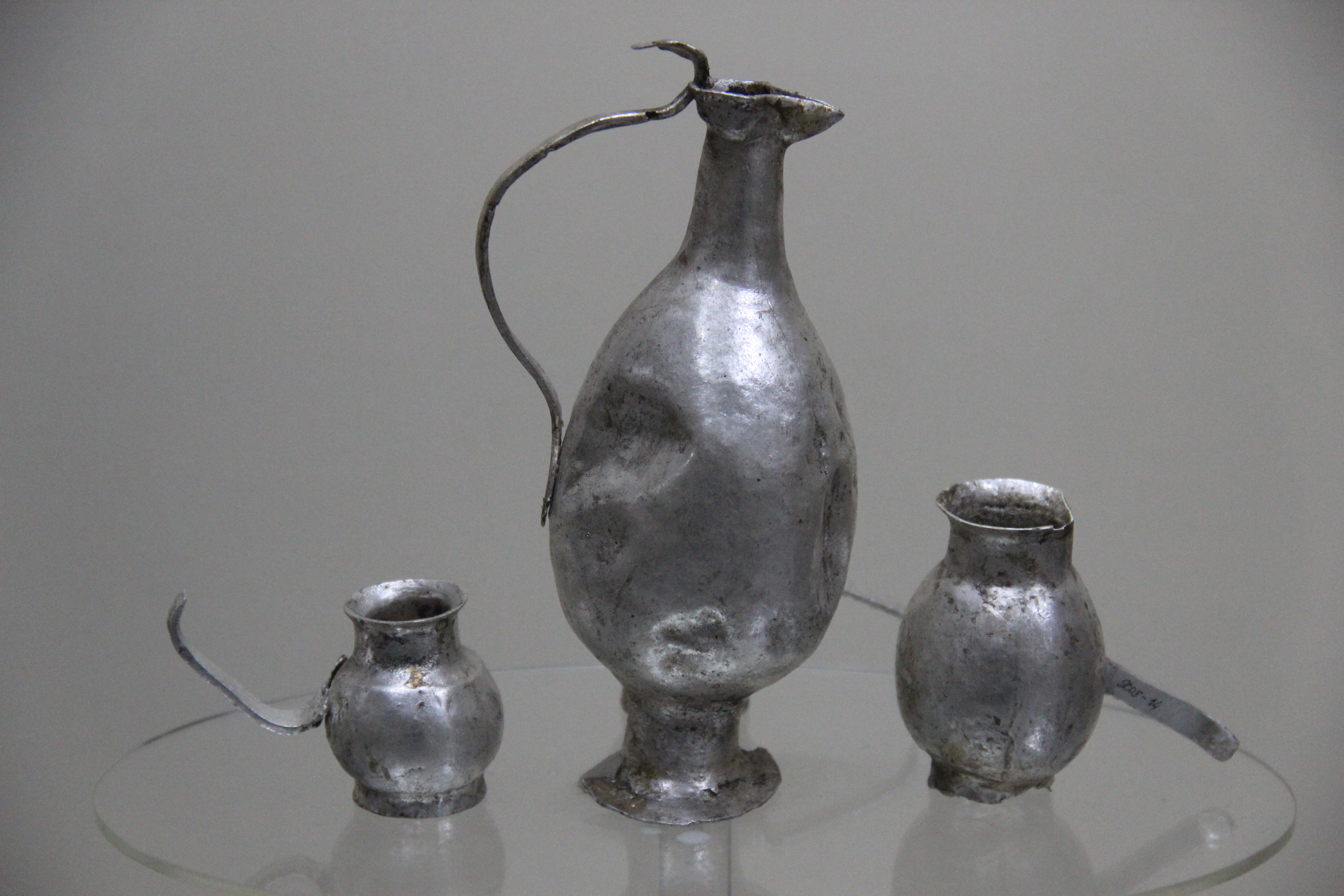
Silver tableware from Kul Tigin's burial site at Khoshoo Tsaidam.

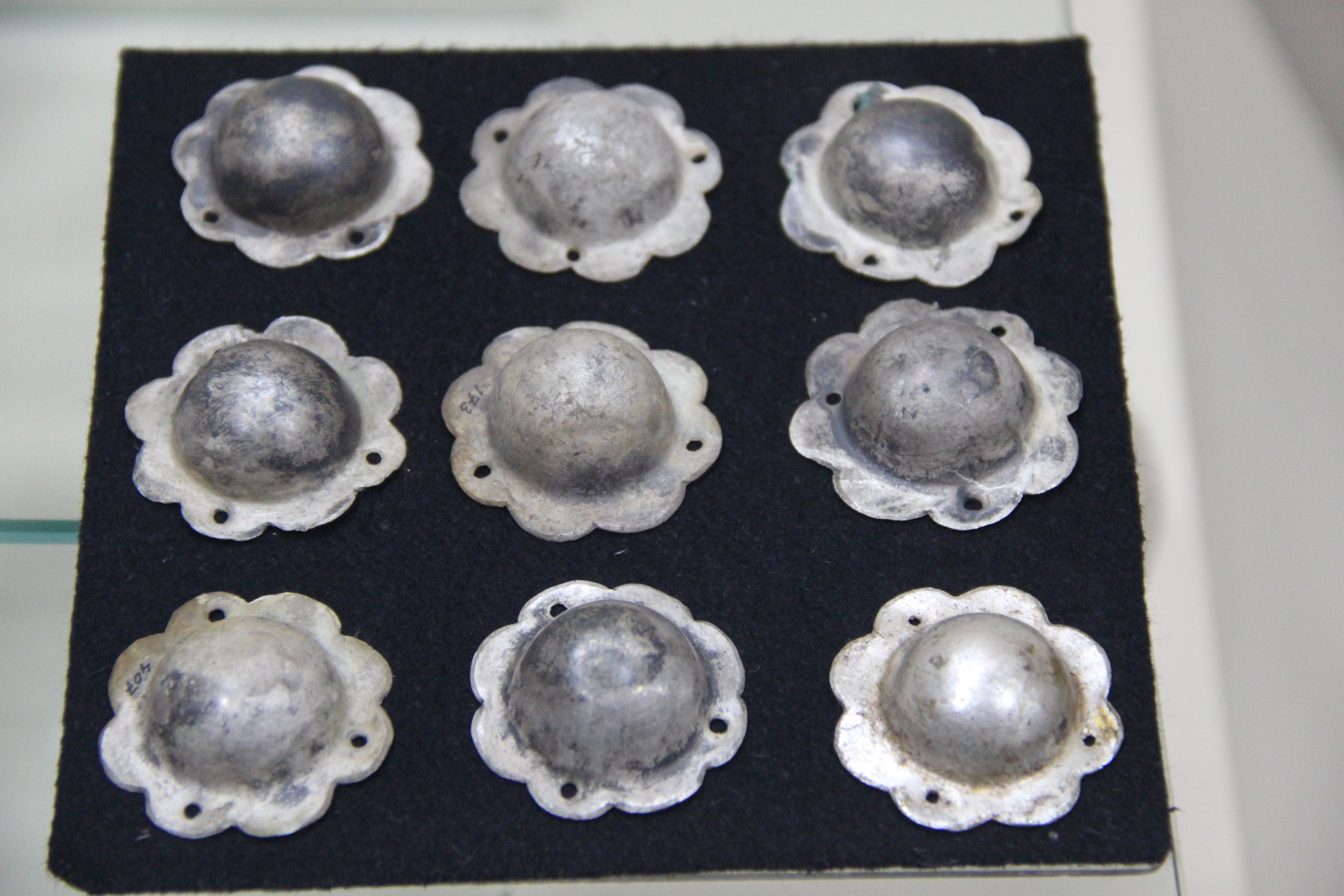
Silver vessels from Kul Tigin's burial site at Khoshoo Tsaidam.

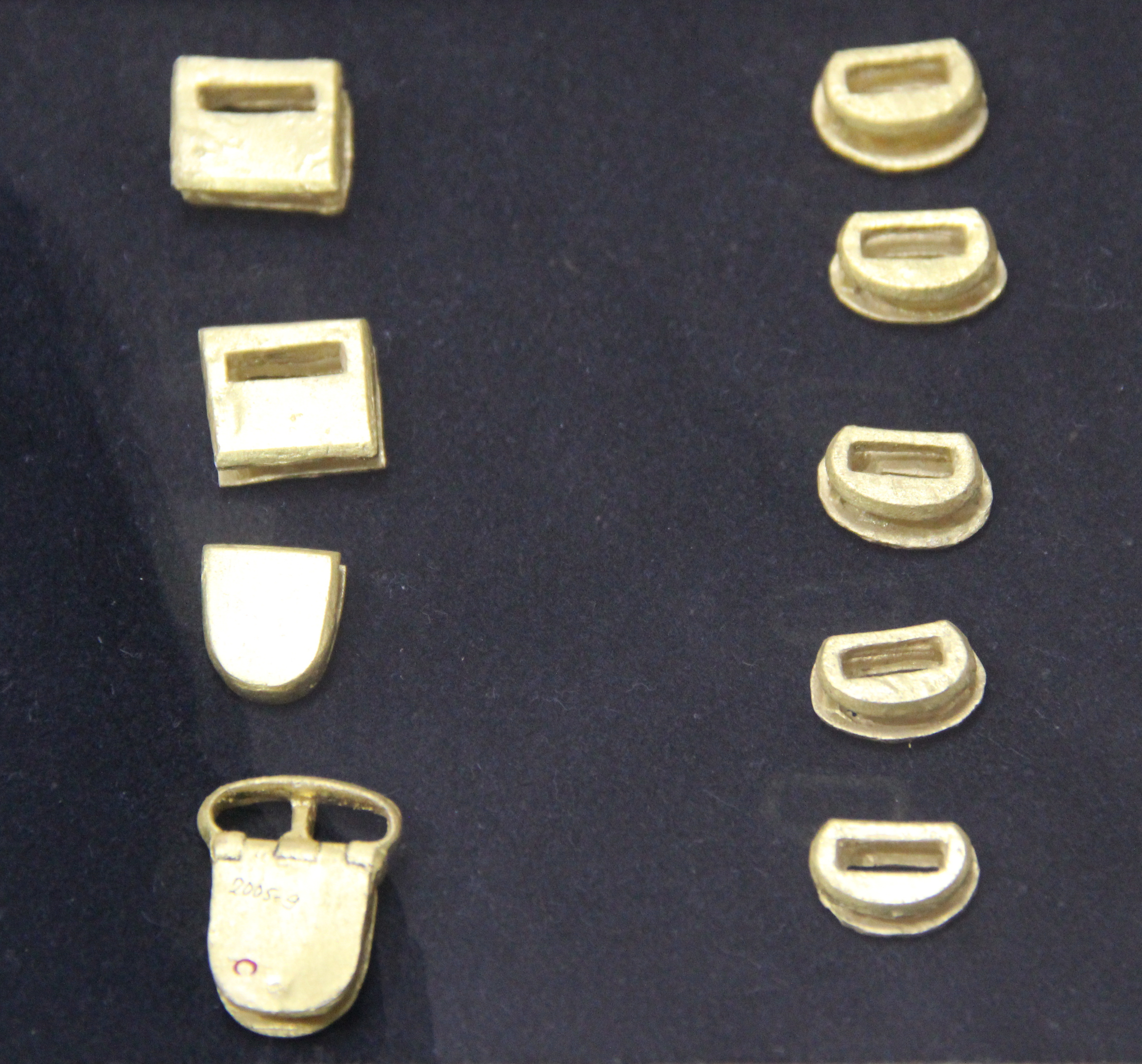
Gold belt ornaments, Tonyukuk ritual place, Tov, Erdene.

== Rulers ==
=== Khagans ===
| Khagan | reign | father, grandfather | Regnal name (Chinese reading) | Personal name (Chinese reading) |
|---|---|---|---|---|
| Ilterish Qaghan | 682–692 | Etmish Beg, Illig Qaghan | Xiédiēlìshī Kèhán | 阿史那骨篤祿; Āshǐnà Gǔdǔlù |
| Qapaghan Qaghan | 692–716 | Etmish Beg, unknown | Qiānshàn Kèhán | 阿史那默啜; Āshǐnà Mòchuài |
| Inel Qaghan | 716–717 | Qapaghan Qaghan, Etmish Beg | Tàxī Kèhán | 阿史那匐俱; Āshǐnà Fújù |
| Bilge Qaghan | 717–734 | Ilterish Qaghan, Etmish Beg | Píjiā Kèhán | 阿史那默棘連; Āshǐnà Mòjílián |
| Yollıg Khagan | 734–739 | Bilge Qaghan, Ilterish Qaghan | Yīrán Kèhán | 阿史那伊然; Āshǐnà Yīrán |
| Tengri Qaghan | 739–741 | Bilge Qaghan, Ilterish Qaghan | Dēnglì Kèhán | 阿史那骨咄; Āshǐnà Gǔduō |
| Ozmish Qaghan (Usurped the throne) | 742–744 | Pan Kul Tigin, Ashina Duoxifu | Wūsūmǐshī Kèhán | 阿史那乌苏米施; Āshǐnà Wūsūmǐshī |
| Kutluk Yabgu Khagan (Usurped the throne) | 741–742 | Unknown (not Ashina) | N/A | Gǔduō Yèhù |
| Ilterish Alp Bilge Qaghan | 742–744 | Uti beg, Ashina Duoxifu | Hèlà Píjiā Kèhán | Ashina Shi (阿史那施) |
| Kulun Beg | 744–745 | Özmiş Khagan, Pan Kul Tigin | Báiméi Kèhán | Ashina Gulongfu |

Later claimants

- Eletmish Kagan 747–759
- Bügü Kagan 759–779

== Bibliography ==
- Barfield, Thomas (1989), The Perilous Frontier - Nomadic Empires and China, Basil Blackwell.
- Chen, Hao (2021), A History of the Second Türk Empire (ca. 682–745 AD), Brill.
- Christoph Baumer, History of Central Asia, volume 2, p. 255-270. The other usual sources (Grousset, Sinor, Christian, UNESCO have summaries)
- Lev Gumilyov, The Ancient Turks, 1967 (long account in Russian at: )
- Schottenhammer, Angela (2023), China and the Silk Roads (ca. 100 BCE to 1800 CE): Role and Content of Its Historical Access to the Outside World, Brill
- Skaff, Jonathan Karam (2012), Sui-Tang China and Its Turko-Mongol Neighbors - Culture, Power, and Connections, 580-800 (Oxford Studies in Early Empires), Oxford University Press.
- Xiong, Victor Cunrui (2000), Sui-Tang Chang'an - A Study in the Urban History of Late Medieval China (Michigan Monographs in Chinese Studies), U OF M CENTER FOR CHINESE STUDIES, ISBN 0892641371.
- Xiong, Victor Cunrui (2008), Historical Dictionary of Medieval China, United States of America: Scarecrow Press, ISBN 978-0810860537.
- Xiong, Victor Cunrui (2023), Heavenly Empress：The Age of Wu Zetian, Ainosco Press
- Yang, Shao-yun (2023), Early Tang China and the World, 618–750 CE, Cambridge University Press
