= National Museum of Mongolia =

Museum in Chingeltei, Ulaanbaatar, Mongolia

- Монголын Үндэсний музей
- Former name: Museum of the Revolution (1971–1991); National Museum of Mongolian History (1991–2008)
- Established: 1971
- Location: Chingeltei, Ulaanbaatar, Mongolia
- Coordinates: 47.9208°N 106.9154°E
- Type: History museum
- Collection size: 60,000 objects
- Owner: Minister of Culture, Sports, Tourism, and Youth
- Website: nationalmuseum.mn

The National Museum of Mongolia (Mongolian: Монголын Үндэсний музей), formerly known as the National Museum of Mongolian History (Mongolian: Монголын үндэсний түүхийн музей), is a history museum focusing on Mongolian history located in Chingeltei, Ulaanbaatar. It characterizes itself as "a cultural, scientific, and educational organization, which is responsible for the collection, care and interpretation of the objects."

== History ==
The origins of the National Museum of Mongolia date back to 1924, when collections were begun for the first museum in Mongolia by the Institute of Scripture, the country's first scientific organization established in 1921. Russian scholars, such as Pyotr Kozlov, V. I. Lisovskii, A. D. Simukov, and the American researcher Roy Chapman Andrews contributed to the museum's early collections and exhibits. In November 1924, during the convocation of the first State Great Khural, the first exhibition of the museum, with around 200 artifacts, was unveiled to the public by its first director Onkhodyn Jamiyan.

State Central Museum building, circa 1974

Following the death of the Bogd Khan, items used by the late khan was inherited by the museum. Subsequently, the museum was relocated to the Winter Palace of the Bogd Khan in 1926. It was later re-established as the State Central Museum of Local Studies in 1940. After a dedicated building was built near the city center of Ulaanbaatar, it was renamed to the State Central Museum. The central museum administered several other museums located in outside Ulaanbaatar and stored all collections of historical, ethnographical, natural history and paleontological. In 1971, the present building of the National Museum was built and housed the Museum of the Revolution.

Relief on the museum's façade, depicting revolutionary heroism of partisans during the People's Revolution

During Mongolia's democratization, the State Central Museum was dissolved into two separate museums—the National Museum of Mongolian History and the Mongolian Natural History Museum—by a government decision in 1991. Situated in the building of former revolutionary museum, the National Museum of Mongolian History inherited the ethnographic, historical, and anthropological exhibits while the Mongolian Natural History Museum received the natural history and paleontological collections. In April 2008, the national museum was renamed to its current name, the National Museum of Mongolia.

== Collections ==
The National Museum of Mongolia is one of the nation's largest museums and holds a collection of over 60,000 objects relating to Mongolian history spanning from prehistory to the end of the 20th century. Only 10-12% of the collected artifacts are on display in the museum's nine exhibition halls. One hall is reserved for temporary exhibitions.

Exhibitions cover prehistory, pre-Mongol Empire history, the Mongol Empire, Mongolia during Qing rule, ethnography and traditional life, and twentieth-century history. The ethnographic collection has significant displays of the traditional dress of various Mongolian ethnic groups and of snuff bottles. Most exhibits have labels in both Mongolian and English.

Historical collection is subdivided into 3 areas: archaeological; medieval history of Mongolia; and modern historical objects and photography, recordings, and documents. The museum publishes one or more issues of its in-house journal each year, with articles in Mongolian and foreign languages, including Russian and English.

=== Gallery ===
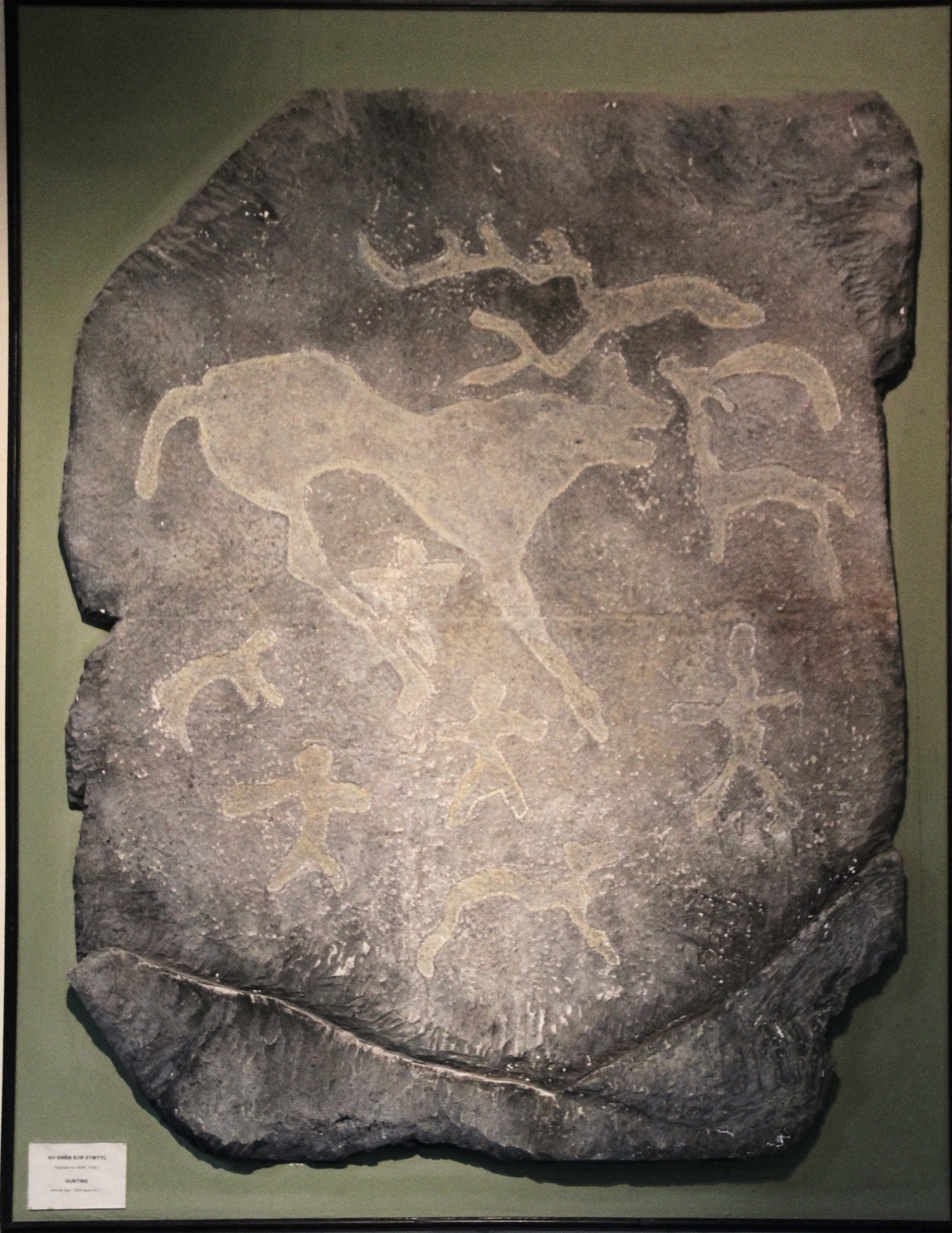
Bronze age artifact depicting deer hunting

Pottery from the Xiongnu period, 3th century BC to early 1st century AD

Silk gown from the Khitan period, late 10th to early 11th century

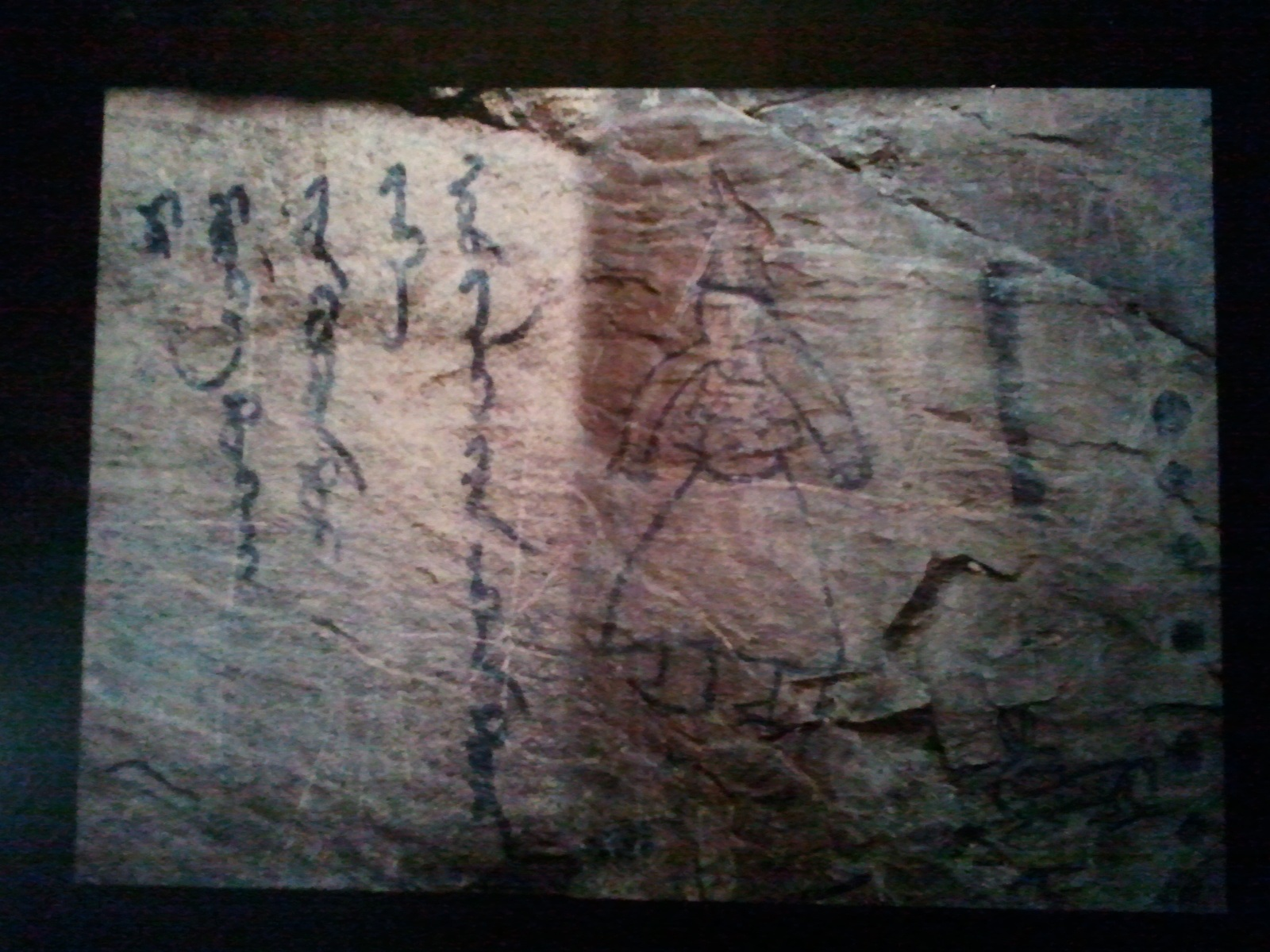
13th-century drawing of a Mongolian woman wearing bogtog headdress

Stone stele with Khitan inscriptions

Bronze mirror from the Mongol Empire

Zhiyuan Baochao paper banknote issued by the Yuan dynasty

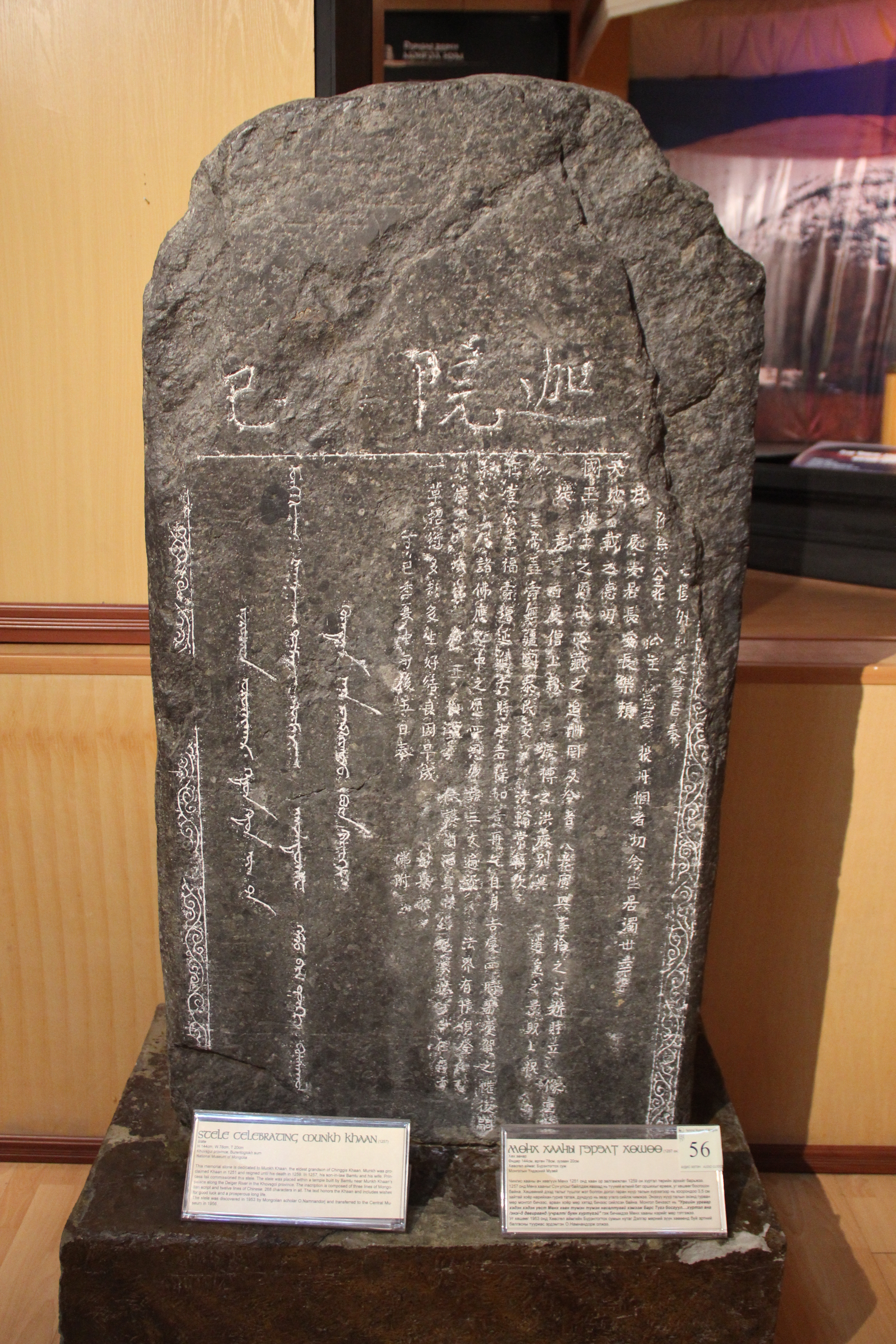
Stele of Mongolian and Chinese inscriptions celebrating Möngke Khan

Gilded bronze sculpture of Yamantaka from the 19th century

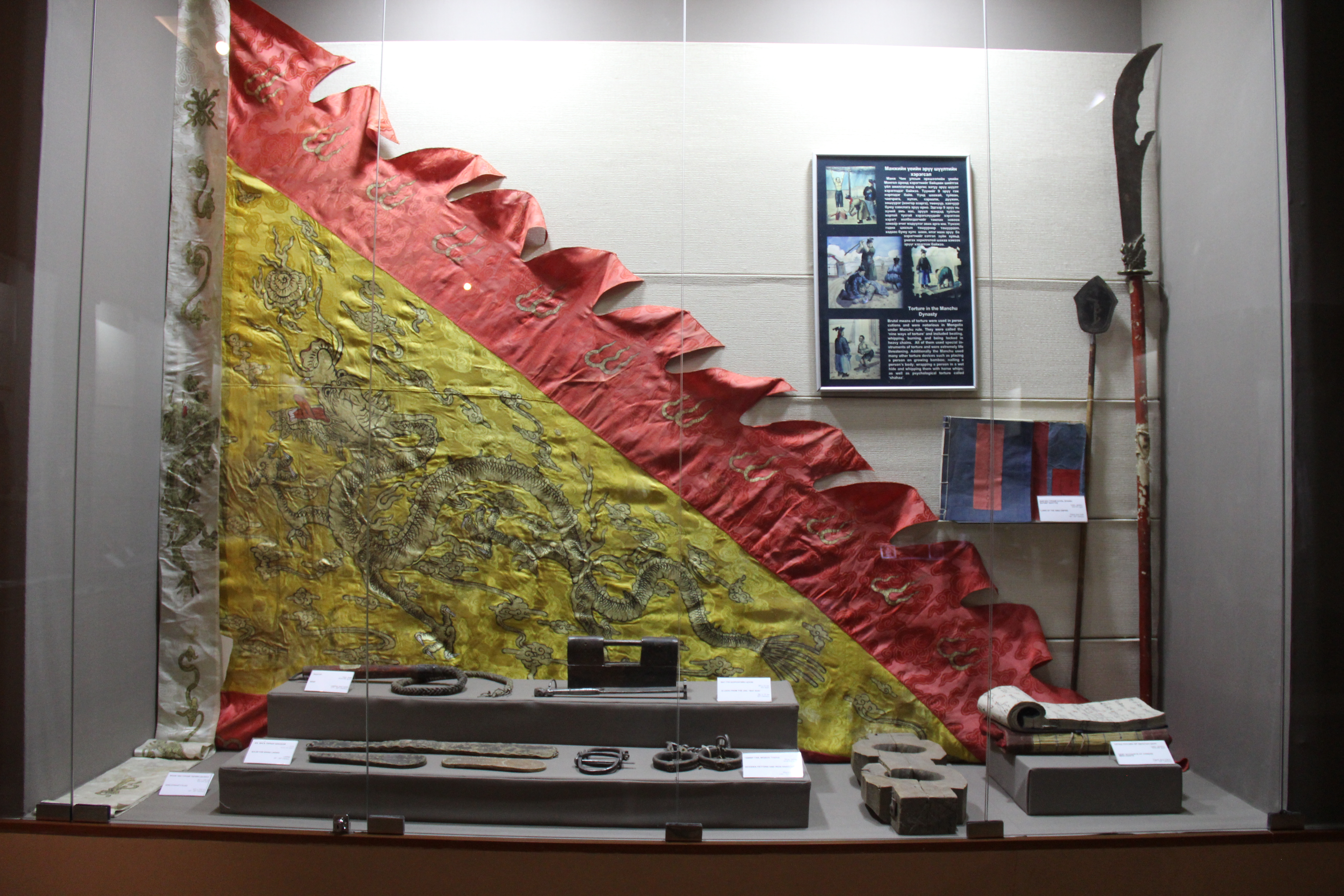
Qing dynasty banner and torture devices used during the Qing rule

Mongolian traditional female jewelry

Early Iron Age bronze ornaments

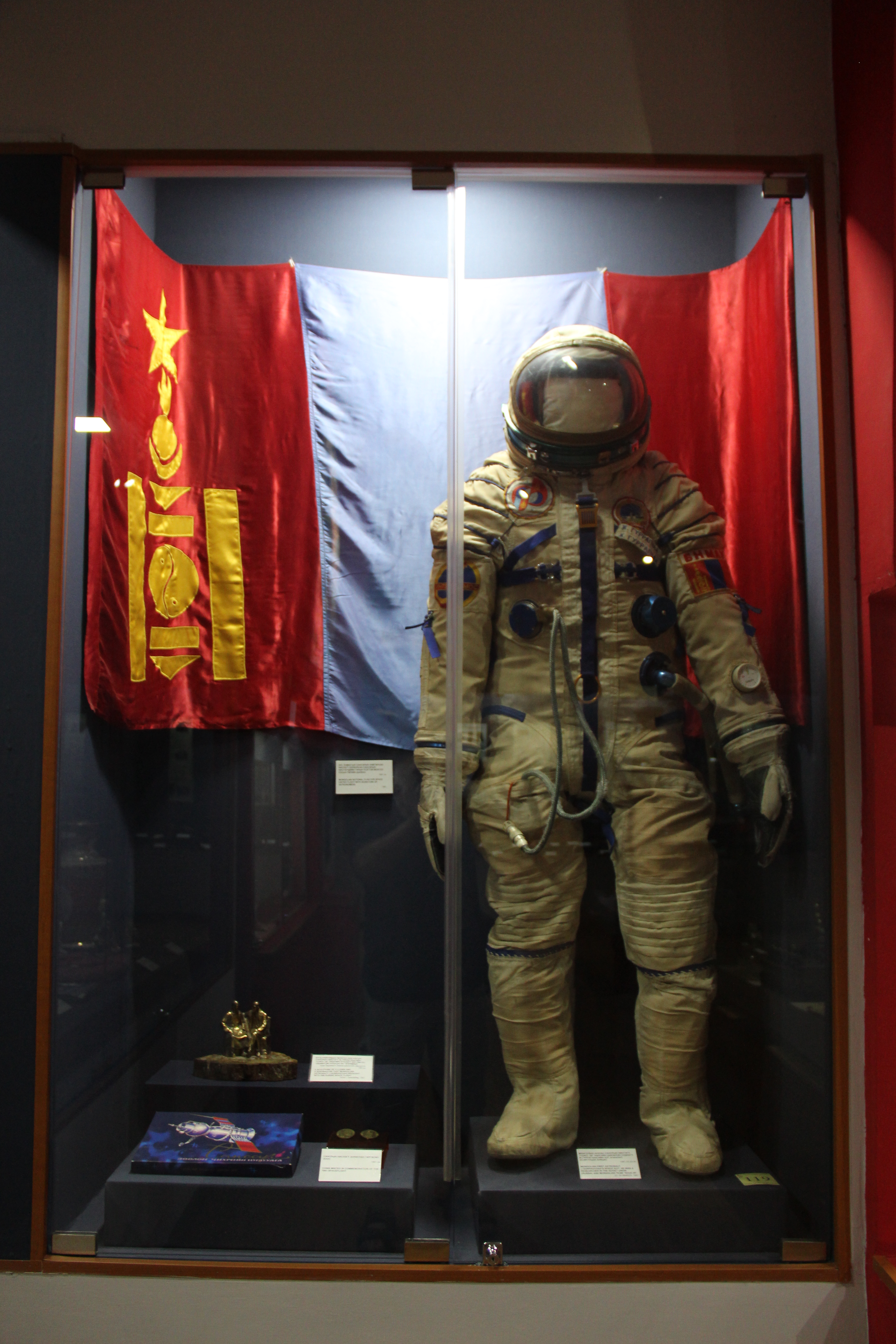
Cosmonaut suit of Jügderdemidiin Gürragchaa, the first Mongolian in space

== See also ==
- List of museums in Mongolia
