= Timeline of the Türgesh =

This is a timeline of the Türgesh.

== 7th century ==
Year	Date	Event
699		Üch Elig establishes the Turgesh Khaganate

== 8th century ==
Year	Date	Event
703		The Turgesh captured Suyab from the Tang dynasty
706		Üch Elig is succeeded by his son Saqal
708		Üch Elig's successor Saqal attacks Qiuci (Kucha)
709		Saqal inflicts a defeat on the Tang dynasty
711		Battle of Bolchu: Qapaghan Qaghan of the Second Turkic Khaganate defeats Saqal and kills him, forcing the Turgesh to flee south to Zhetysu
717		Battle of Aksu: Saqal's successor Suluk leads Arabs, Tibetans, and Turgesh against the Tang in Aksu and is defeated
719		Suluk captures Suiye (Suyab)
720		Suluk inflicts a defeat on the Umayyad Caliphate
722		Suluk concludes a marriage alliance with the Tang dynasty and gains Princess Jiaohe
724		Day of Thirst: Suluk inflicts a defeat on the Umayyad Caliphate
726		Suluk attacks Qiuci (Kucha)
727		Suluk and the Tibetan Empire attack Qiuci (Kucha)
728		Suluk aids the Sogdians in revolt against the Umayyad Caliphate
731		Battle of the Defile: Suluk attacks the Umayyad Caliphate
735		Suluk attacks Ting Prefecture (Jimsar County)
737		Battle of the Baggage: Turgesh inflicts a defeat on the Umayyad Caliphate
737		Battle of Kharistan: Suluk is defeated by the Umayyad Caliphate and killed by his relative Kül-chor
740		Kül-chor submits to the Tang dynasty but later rebels anyway
744		Kül-chor is defeated by the Tang dynasty and executed
748		The Tang dynasty recaptures Suyab and destroys it
750		The Turgesh-Chach alliance is defeated by the Tang dynasty
766		The Karluks annex Turgesh land in Zhetysu

== Bibliography ==
- Asimov, M.S. (1998), History of civilizations of Central Asia Volume IV The age of achievement: A.D. 750 to the end of the fifteenth century Part One The historical, social and economic setting, UNESCO Publishing
- Barfield, Thomas (1989), The Perilous Frontier: Nomadic Empires and China, Basil Blackwell
- Beckwith, Christopher I (1987), The Tibetan Empire in Central Asia: A History of the Struggle for Great Power among Tibetans, Turks, Arabs, and Chinese during the Early Middle Ages, Princeton University Press
- Blankinship, Khalid Yahya (1994). The End of the Jihâd State: The Reign of Hishām ibn ʻAbd al-Malik and the Collapse of the Umayyads. Albany, New York: State University of New York Press. ISBN 978-0-7914-1827-7.
- Bregel, Yuri (2003), An Historical Atlas of Central Asia, Brill
- Golden, Peter B. (1992), An Introduction to the History of the Turkic Peoples: Ethnogenesis and State-Formation in Medieval and Early Modern Eurasia and the Middle East, OTTO HARRASSOWITZ · WIESBADEN
- Millward, James (2009), Eurasian Crossroads: A History of Xinjiang, Columbia University Press
- Shaban, M. A. (1979), The ʿAbbāsid Revolution, Cambridge: Cambridge University Press, ISBN 0-521-29534-3
- Wang, Zhenping (2013), Tang China in Multi-Polar Asia: A History of Diplomacy and War, University of Hawaii Press
- Xiong, Victor (2008), Historical Dictionary of Medieval China, United States of America: Scarecrow Press, Inc., ISBN 978-0810860537
- Xue, Zongzheng (薛宗正). (1992). Turkic peoples (突厥史). Beijing: 中国社会科学出版社. ISBN 978-7-5004-0432-3; OCLC 28622013
