= El Etmish Kutluk Bilge =

El Etmish Kutluk Bilge 伊里底蜜施骨咄禄毗伽
- Khagan of the Turgesh
- Reign: 744–749
- Predecessor: Kül-chor
- Successor: Yibo
- Born: Tumodu (都摩度)

El Etmish Kutluk Bilge (Chinese: 伊里底蜜施骨咄禄毗伽; pinyin: Yīlǐ dǐmìshī gǔduōlù píjiā) was a khagan of the Turgesh.

== Early life ==
He was born Tumodu (都摩度) in the Black Turgesh tribe. He was a high-ranking general in Suluk's army, however his name can be a title as well. After Baga Tarkhan's coup, he supported Suluk's son Kut Chor in Suyab.

== Reign ==
After Baga Tarkhan's fall, he was acknowledged as khagan by Xuanzong on 26 July 744. It is not known when he died. He was followed by Yibo.
