= Ji Chuna =

Ji Chuna (Chinese: 紀處訥; died July 24, 710) was an official of the Chinese Tang dynasty, serving as a chancellor during the reign of Emperor Zhongzong and Emperor Zhongzong's son Emperor Shang. He was a member of the faction of Emperor Zhongzong's powerful wife Empress Wei, and was killed after she was killed in a coup in 710.

== Background ==
It is not known when Ji Chuna was born, but it is known that his family was from Qin Prefecture (秦州, roughly modern Tianshui, Gansu). His grandfather Ji Shiteng (紀士騰) served as a local governor for Tang dynasty's predecessor Sui dynasty, and his father Ji Ji (紀及) did the same for Tang. Little is known about Ji Chuna's early career, but it is known that his wife and the wife of Wu Sansi, an honored nephew of Wu Zetian and cousin of her son Li Xian the Crown Prince, were sisters. Ji Chuna himself was said to be tall and handsome.

== During Emperor Zhongzong's second reign ==
In 705, Wu Zetian was overthrown in a coup, and Li Xian, formerly emperor, was returned to the throne (as Emperor Zhongzong). Wu Sansi nevertheless remained a trusted advisor, particularly because he was also the lover of Emperor Zhongzong's powerful wife Empress Wei. On account of his relationship with Wu Sansi, Ji Chuna, who was then a commanding general of the imperial guards, was made acting minister of storage (太府卿, Taifu Qing). He was considered one of Wu Sansi's closest associates.

In 707, there was a major drought, and Emperor Zhongzong summoned Ji to discuss the matter with him. The next day, Wu Sansi had the acting director of the imperial astronomical conservatory, Jiaye Zhizhong (迦葉志忠) submit a report stating that the night before, that the star Sheti (攝提) had entered the constellation Taiwei Palace (太微宮), symbolizing that a faithful official had entered the palace and met the emperor. Emperor Zhongzong was convinced that it involved his meeting with Ji, and issued an edict that praised Ji for great faithfulness that caused the stars to reflect him, and awarded him with clothes and silk. Later that year, when Emperor Zhongzong's crown prince Li Chongjun, by a concubine, who had been repeatedly insulted by Empress Wei's powerful daughter Li Guo'er the Princess Anle, whose husband was Wu Sansi's son Wu Chongxun (武崇訓), and could not bear such insult, rose in rebellion, killing Wu Sansi and Wu Chongxun and then attacking the palace, Ji was described as one of the officials leading forces to defend against the attack on the palace. Li Chongjun was subsequently defeated and killed in flight. Thereafter, Ji and a chancellor associated with Wu Sansi, Zong Chuke, made repeated attempts to implicate the senior chancellor Wei Yuanzhong in the plot, and were eventually able to get Emperor Zhongzong to exile, but not execute, Wei Yuanzhong. Meanwhile, Ji was given the designation Tong Zhongshu Menxia Sanpin (同中書門下三品), making him a chancellor de facto, and soon thereafter, he was made Shizhong (侍中) -- the head of the examination bureau of government (門下省) and a post considered one for a chancellor.

In 708, Ji was involved in an incident that would cause Suoge (娑葛), the chieftain of the Tuqishi (突騎施), to rebel. Suoge had in 706 succeeded his father Wuzhile (烏質勒), and Wuzhile's subordinate Juechuo Zhongjie (闕啜忠節) had been unwilling to submit to Suoge. Juechuo was, however, unable to prevail over Suoge, and he was set to give up his forces and go to the Tang capital Chang'an, when the Tang general Zhou Yiti (周以悌) suggested to him the idea of bribing Zong and Ji to launch an attack against Suoge. Juechuo did so, and Zong, after Juechuo's bribery, proposed to Emperor Zhongzong the idea of attacking Suoge in alliance with Tufan, which Emperor Zhongzong agreed despite opposition by the general Guo Yuanzhen. Suoge heard of this plan and acted first, successfully attacking several Tang outposts and then sending an envoy to Chang'an to demand that Zong be executed. Subsequently, Guo reported the facts of the situation to Emperor Zhongzong, and Emperor Zhongzong sent a peace envoy to make peace with Suoge and creating him Shisixing Khan. Subsequently, in 709, the censor Cui Wan (崔琬) submitted articles of impeachment against Zong and Ji for corruption that led to disaster on the borders. The protocol at that time required that, as the articles of impeachment were read, that the accused officials step out of the palace and await imperial instructions, but Zong did not do so and, in anger, spoke to Emperor Zhongzong and stated that he was faithful and being falsely accused. Instead of investigating, Emperor Zhongzong ordered Zong and Cui swear to brotherhood with each other, causing the people to give Emperor Zhongzong the semi-derogatory epithet of "Peacemaking Son of Heaven."

In 710, Emperor Zhongzong was about to marry Princess Jincheng, the daughter of his cousin Li Shouli the Prince of Yong, to Tufan's king Me Agtsom, and he initially ordered Ji to escort Princess Jincheng to Tufan, but Ji declined the assignment, as did another chancellor, Zhao Yanzhao. Emperor Zhongzong eventually sent the general Yang Ju (楊矩) to do so.

== Death ==
In summer 710, Emperor Zhongzong died suddenly—a death that traditional historians believed to be a poisoning carried out by Empress Wei and Li Guo'er, so that Empress Wei could eventually become "emperor" like Wu Zetian, and Li Guo'er could become crown princess. Meanwhile, however, another son of Emperor Zhongzong's, Li Chongmao the Prince of Wen, was named emperor (as Emperor Shang), but Empress Wei retained power as empress dowager and regent. She sent a number of her associates to survey the circuits to make sure that no one would dare rise against her, and Ji Chuna was sent to survey Guannei Circuit (關內道, roughly modern Shaanxi). After Ji left the capital Chang'an, a coup led by Emperor Zhongzong's sister Princess Taiping and nephew Li Longji the Prince of Linzi killed Empress Wei and Li Guo'er, along with a number of their associates. At that time, Ji had reached Hua Prefecture (華州, roughly modern Weinan, Shaanxi), and was arrested and executed.

== Notes and references ==
- Old Book of Tang, vol. 92.
- New Book of Tang, vol. 109.
- Zizhi Tongjian, vols. 208, 209.
