= Zhao Yanzhao =

8th-century Chinese Tang dynasty chancellor

Zhao Yanzhao (Chinese: 趙彥昭; fl.700 – 714), courtesy name Huanran (奐然), was an official of the Chinese Tang dynasty and Wu Zhou dynasty, serving as a chancellor during the reigns of Emperor Zhongzong, Emperor Shang, and Emperor Ruizong.

== Background ==
It is not known when Zhao Yanzhao was born, but it is known that his family was originally from Gan Prefecture (甘州, roughly modern Zhangye, Gansu). His father Zhao Wumeng (趙武孟) was known for favoring hunting during youth. On one occasion, when Zhao Wumeng had killed some fresh prey and presented it to his mother (Zhao Yanzhao's grandmother), Zhao Wumeng's mother wept and stated, "You do not study and only hunt all day. I feel hopeless." She refused the food. After that incident, Zhao Wumeng became studious and passed the imperial examination. He later served as an imperial censor during the reign of Wu Zetian and authored a 10-volume work on the notable people of the Hexi Corridor, the region he was from.

Zhao Yanzhao himself was known for literary talent and being high-spirited. He passed the imperial examination as well, and was made the sheriff of Nanbu County (南部, in modern Nanchong, Sichuan). It was around this time that he became a friend of several later prominent politicians, Guo Yuanzhen, Xue Ji, and Xiao Zhizhong. He later served as the magistrate of Xinfeng County (新豐, in modern Shaoguan, Guangdong), before he was recalled to serve as Jiancha Yushi (監察御史), a mid-level imperial censor.

== During Emperor Zhongzong's second reign ==
In 709, during the reign of Wu Zetian's son Emperor Zhongzong, Zhao Yanzhao was promoted to be Zhongshu Shilang (中書侍郎), the deputy head of the legislative bureau of government (中書省) and given the designation Tong Zhongshu Menxia Pingzhangshi (同中書門下平章事), making him a chancellor de facto. He was also made an imperial scholar at the Xiuwen Pavilion (修文館).

In 710, Emperor Zhongzong was set to marry Princess Jincheng, the daughter of his nephew Li Shouli the Prince of Yong, to Tufan's king Me Agtsom. He initially ordered the chancellor Ji Chuna to escort Princess Jincheng to Tufan, but after Ji declined, ordered Zhao to do so. Zhao did not want to go—believing that if he left the capital Chang'an, the favors that Emperor Zhongzong had shown him might wane in his absence. At the suggestion of Zhao Lüwen (趙履溫), he asked Emperor Zhongzong's powerful daughter Li Guo'er the Princess Anle to speak on his behalf, and Emperor Zhongzong sent the general Yang Ju (楊矩) instead.

== During Emperor Shang's reign and Emperor Ruizong's second reign ==
Later in 710, Emperor Zhongzong died suddenly—a death that traditional historians believed to be a poisoning carried out by his powerful wife Empress Wei and Li Guo'er, so that Empress Wei could eventually be "emperor" like Wu Zetian and Li Guo'er could be crown princess. For the time being, Emperor Zhongzong's son by a concubine, Li Chongmao the Prince of Wen, was named emperor, but Empress Wei retained power as empress dowager and regent. Zhao Yanzhao continued to serve as chancellor. Less than a month later, a coup led by Emperor Zhongzong's sister Princess Taiping and nephew Li Longji the Prince of Linzi killed Empress Dowager Wei and Li Guo'er. Subsequently, Li Longji's father Li Dan the Prince of Xiang, a former emperor, returned to the throne (as Emperor Ruizong), displacing Emperor Shang.

Shortly after Emperor Ruizong took the throne, Zhao was demoted to be the prefect of Jiang Prefecture (絳州, part of modern Yuncheng, Shanxi), but was almost immediately recalled to again serve as Zhongshu Shilang and chancellor. Later that year, however, he was again demoted, this time to be the prefect of Songzhou. Later, for reasons unclear, he was further demoted to be the prefect of Gui Prefecture (歸州, roughly modern Yichang, Hubei). Later, he was promoted to be the commandant at Liang Prefecture (涼州, roughly modern Wuwei, Gansu). He was said to be stern at Liang Prefecture, instilling much fear in his subordinates. He was subsequently recalled to serve as the deputy minister of civil service affairs (吏部侍郎, Libu Shilang), and later the chief imperial censor (御史大夫, Yushi Daifu).

== During Emperor Xuanzong's reign ==
In 712, Emperor Ruizong passed the throne to Li Longji, who took the throne as Emperor Xuanzong, but Emperor Ruizong retained actual powers as Taishang Huang (retired emperor). In 713, locked in a rivalry with Princess Taiping, Emperor Xuanzong carried out a purge of her party and forced her to commit suicide, and Emperor Ruizong yielded powers to him. Two of the officials involved in Emperor Xuanzong's purge who served chancellors, Guo Yuanzhen and Zhang Shuo, were friendly with Zhao Yanzhao, and they claimed that he was part of the plot as well. Zhao was therefore made the minister of justice (刑部尚書, Xingbu Shangshu) and created the Duke of Geng. It was around this time that Zhang, who feared that another official, Yao Yuanzhi, might be made chancellor as well, asked Zhao to submit an indictment against Yao, but Emperor Xuanzong summarily dismissed the indictment. Yao was subsequently made chancellor, and Zhang was demoted. Zhao was himself made a commanding general to the north of the capital.

In 714, the imperial censor Jiang Hui (姜晦), pointing out that at the time of Emperor Zhongzong's death and that Empress Wei's cousin Wei Wen and fellow chancellor Zong Chuke altered Emperor Zhongzong's will to remove Emperor Ruizong as coregent, Zhao, Wei Sili, Wei Anshi, and Li Jiao were all chancellors and did nothing to stop them, had his subordinate Guo Zhen (郭震) file an indictment against the former chancellors. Guo's indictment further accused Zhao of honoring the witch Zhao Wuniang (趙五娘) as an aunt and secretly meeting her, while wearing women's clothing, with his wife, to ask her to use witchcraft to have him made chancellor, during Emperor Zhongzong's reign. These former chancellors were all demoted, with Zhao reduced to being the secretary general of Jiang Prefecture (江州, roughly modern Jiujiang, Jiangxi). He died while still at Jiang Prefecture, but it is not known when that occurred.
