= Xue Ne =

Chinese military general and politician

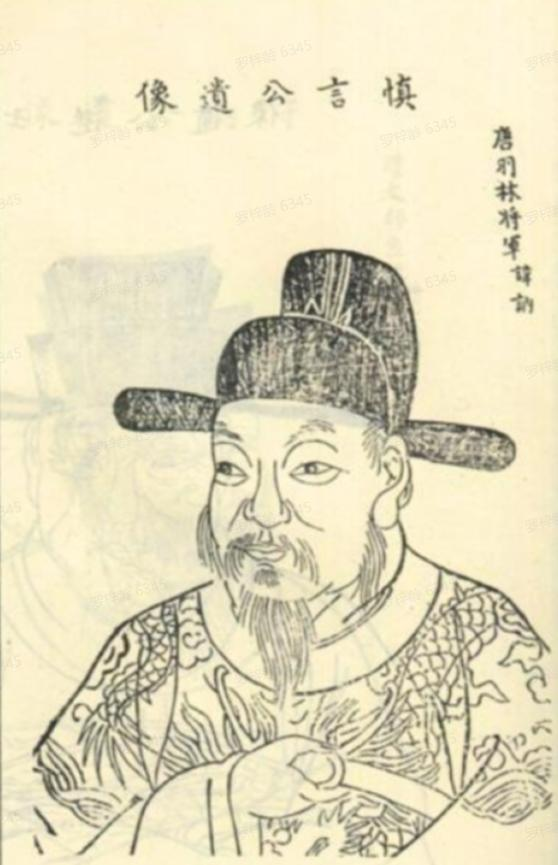

Xue Ne (Chinese: 薛訥; pinyin: Xuē Nè, 649–720, courtesy name 慎言 Shènyán, formally Duke Zhaoding of Pingyang 平陽昭定公), was a Chinese military general and politician of the Tang dynasty and of Wu Zetian's Zhou dynasty, serving as a chancellor and major general during the reign of Emperor Xuanzong.

== Background ==
Xue Ne was a son of the general Xue Rengui, well known for his service during the reign of Emperor Gaozong. He was born in 649, around the time that Emperor Gaozong succeeded his father Emperor Taizong. He started his government service career as a Chengmen Lang (城門郎) -- an official of the examination bureau of government (門下省, Menxia Sheng) in charge of palace gates.

== During Wu Zetian's reign and Emperor Zhongzong's second reign ==
During the reign of Emperor Gaozong's wife Wu Zetian, Xue Ne served as the magistrate of Lantian County (藍田, in modern Xi'an, Shaanxi). At that time, there was a rich businessman named Ni who was litigating a case over interests—possibly interests on loans made to the government. The deputy chief imperial censor Lai Junchen, after receiving bribes from Ni, awarded Ni grain from governmental storages as interests. Xue opposed, pointing out that the food storage was in preparation for natural disasters and should not be used to repay debts, and submitted a petition to that effect. Soon thereafter, Lai was convicted of crimes, and Lai's actions were cancelled.

During a later Göktürk incursion in 698, because Xue was the son of a great general, Wu Zetian made him an acting general to defend the northeastern part of the border. Before departing, Xue told Wu Zetian that the Göktürk leader, Qapaghan Qaghan, had used the fact that Wu Zetian had previously exiled her son Li Xian, formerly an emperor (Emperor Zhongzong), as excuse, and that while Li Xian had recently been restored to crown prince status, there were still doubts. He believed that if Li Xian's position appeared firm, Qapaghan's declarations would be ineffective, and Wu Zetian agreed. After the campaign, Xue was made the commandant at You Prefecture (幽州, roughly Beijing) and Protectorate General to Pacify the East. Xue continued to serve there throughout the rest of her reign and the reign of Li Xian (who returned to the throne in 705 as Emperor Zhongzong).

== During Emperor Ruizong's second reign ==
As of 710, by which time another son of Emperor Gaozong's and Wu Zetian's who had also previously been emperor, Emperor Ruizong, was emperor, Xue was still at You Prefecture, when there was a Kumo Xī and Xí (Chinese: 霫) incursion. Xue tried to attack the Xī and Xí forces as they withdrew, but could not defeat them.

In 712, one of Xue's subordinates, Li Jin (李璡) the prefect of Yan Prefecture (燕州, in modern Beijing), made false accusations against Xue to the chancellor Liu Youqiu. Liu recommended the general Sun Quan (Chinese: 孫佺) to replace Xue. Emperor Ruizong thus made Sun the commandant at You Prefecture and moved Xue to be the secretary general at Bing Prefecture (并州, roughly modern Taiyuan, Shanxi). (The overly aggressive Sun was subsequently defeated and captured by the Xī chief Li Dabu (李大酺), with the loss of nearly the entire army. Li Dabu delivered him to Qapaghan Qaghan, who beheaded him.)

== During Emperor Xuanzong's reign ==
Later in 712, Emperor Ruizong passed the throne to his son Li Longji the Crown Prince, and Li Longji took the throne as Emperor Xuanzong. In 713, during a major examination of troops, after Emperor Xuanzong ordered the chancellor Guo Yuanzhen exiled and the official Tang Shao (唐紹) for failing to get the armies into proper order during the examination, the generals were shocked and panicking, with the exception of Xue Ne and Jie Wan (解琬). Emperor Xuanzong was impressed with them and praised them greatly.

In 714, Xue proposed an ambitious plan to get the Khitan, Xī, and Xí to resubmit to Tang—believing that it could be accomplished by defeating the Khitan and reestablishing Liucheng (柳城, in modern Chaoyang, Liaoning). Emperor Xuanzong himself wanted to take vengeance for Sun Quan's defeat, and despite opposition by the chancellor Yao Chong, Emperor Xuanzong approved of Xue's plan. Further, he granted Xue the status of Tong Ziwei Huangmen Sanpin (同紫微黃門三品), making him a chancellor de facto, and commissioned him with 60,000 men to attack the Khitan, assisted by Du Binke (杜賓客) and Cui Xuandao (崔宣道). Xue launched the attack in summer 714, despite Du's warnings that the summer heat made it a difficult time for soldiers to be wearing armor and bearing heavy food burdens. As Xue advanced, he fell into a Khitan trap, and Khitan forces crushed Tang forces, at an 80-90% casualty rate. Xue was able to flee with some cavalry soldiers, and Khitan soldiers insulted him by referring to him as "Grandmother Xue." After the defeat, Xue blamed the defeat on Cui and eight non-Han officers; Emperor Xuanzong ordered them executed at You Prefecture, but spared Xue and only removed him from all of his offices. Only Du was not punished.

In fall 714, forces of the Tibetan Empire under the generals 'Bod da rgyas (Tibetan: འབོད་ད་རྒྱལ, Chinese: 坌達延) and We Trisig Shangnyen attacked Lan Prefecture (蘭州, roughly modern Lanzhou, Gansu). Emperor Xuanzong commissioned Xue as an acting general and had him defend against the Tibetan attack, assisted by the general Guo Zhiyun (郭知運) and the official Wang Jun. Xue engaged Tibetan forces at Wujie (武街, in modern Dingxi, Gansu), and defeated Tibetan forces. Emperor Xuanzong restored Xue's general rank and created him the Duke of Pingyang. In 715, Emperor Xuanzong further made Xue the commandant at Liang Prefecture (涼州, roughly modern Wuwei, Gansu), to prepare for potential attacks from Ashina Mochuo. Emperor Xuanzong soon also commissioned Xue as the commanding general of the soldiers in the Shuofang region (朔方, roughly modern Yinchuan, Ningxia), assisted by Du and the official Lü Yanzuo (呂延祚), to attack the Göktürks, although whether the army was actually launched or not was unclear.

After Qapaghan Qaghan was killed in an attack against the Bayegu tribe (拔野古) in 716, many Göktürk vassals surrendered to Tang, and Göktürk fell into a state of confusion. Thereafter, however, Qapaghan's nephew became Bilge Khagan, and as khagan tried to restrengthen the Göktürk state. In winter 716, some of the Göktürk who surrendered to Tang rebelled and fled back north, under the leadership of Xiedie Sitai (𨁂跌思泰) and Axilan (阿悉爛). Emperor Xuanzong commissioned Xue to give chase, but before Xue could arrive, Wang and Guo already defeated the rebels in battle, although the rebels were nevertheless able to disengage and get back to Göktürk. Soon thereafter, Xue retired. He died in 720.

== Notes and references ==
- Old Book of Tang, vol. 93.
- New Book of Tang, vol. 111.
- Zizhi Tongjian, vols. 206, 207, 210, 211.
