= Ata Boyla Qaghan =

Ata Boyla 阿多裴罗
- Khagan of the Turgesh
- Reign: 750s–760s
- Predecessor: Tengri Ermish Qaghan
- Successor: Uyghur Khaganate annexation

Ata Boyla (Chinese: 阿多裴罗; pinyin: Āduō Péiluō) — was the last known khagan of Turgesh. He was mentioned in Cefu Yuanqui and New Book of Tang as the khagan who sent envoys to Tang on 24 September 759. When the Turgesh state was destroyed by invading Karluks in 766, refugees mostly escaped to Yanqi. Leading his Turgesh people, he submitted to Uyghur Qaghanate.
