= Zong Chuke =

Tang and Zhou dynasty chancellor

Zong Chuke (宗楚客) (died July 24, 710), courtesy name Shu'ao (叔敖), was an official of the Chinese Tang dynasty and Wu Zetian's Zhou dynasty, serving as chancellor during the reigns of Wu Zetian, her son Emperor Zhongzong, and her grandson Emperor Shang.

== Background ==
It is not known when Zong Chuke was born, but it is known that his family was from Pu Prefecture (蒲州, roughly modern Yuncheng, Shanxi). His ancestors were originally from Nanyang, and his great-grandfather Zong Pi (宗丕) had served as an official during late Liang dynasty (a period sometimes known as Western Liang). After Liang, then a vassal of Sui dynasty, was terminated in 587 by Sui, which directly took control of its territory, Zong Pi resettled in what would eventually become Pu Prefecture. Zong Chuke's father Zong Ji (宗岌) served on the staff of Emperor Taizong's favorite son Li Tai the Prince of Wei and participated in a project that Li Tai commissioned—the writing of a work known as the Journal of Geography (Kuodi Zhi). Zong Chuke's mother was a cousin of Empress Wu (later known as Wu Zetian), the second wife of Emperor Taizong's son and successor Emperor Gaozong. Zong Chuke had at least two brothers—an older brother named Zong Qinke, and a younger brother named Zong Jinqing (宗晉卿). Zong Chuke himself was described as tall, with a handsome beard. After passing the imperial examination, he served as an official, eventually serving as the deputy minister of census (戶部侍郎, Hubu Shilang) late in Emperor Gaozong's reign.

After Emperor Gaozong's death in 683, his son Li Zhe the Crown Prince succeeded him (as Emperor Zhongzong), but Empress Wu retained actual power as empress dowager and regent. In 684, after he showed signs of independence, she deposed him and replaced him with brother Li Dan the Prince of Yu (as Emperor Ruizong), but wielded power even more firmly thereafter, and as the years went by, she showed signs that she wanted to be "emperor" herself rather than just empress dowager. Zong Chuke's brother Zong Qinke encouraged her, and in 690 created a number of modified Chinese characters as signs of good fortune.

== During Wu Zetian's reign ==
Later in 690, Wu Zetian had Emperor Ruizong yield the throne to her, and she took the throne as emperor, establishing a new Zhou dynasty and interrupting Tang dynasty. She made Zong Qinke Neishi (內史) -- the head of the legislative bureau of government (鳳閣, Fengge) and a post considered one for a chancellor, while Zong Chuke remained a deputy minister and Zong Jinqing became a commander of the imperial guards. Just slightly over a month after taking the throne and making Zong Qinke a chancellor, however, she received accusations that Zong Qinke was corrupt and Zong Chuke and Zong Jinqing, in addition to being corrupt, also committed rape. She demoted Zong Qinke to be the sheriff of Zunhua County (遵化, in modern Qinzhou, Guangxi) while exiling Zong Chuke and Zong Jinqing to the same region. Zong Qinke died in exile, but Zong Chuke and Zong Jinqing were recalled after about a year in exile. It was probably around this time that he served as a low-level official at the minister of defense and became considered familiar with military matters. On one occasion, when there were reports that the Tujue chief Tashili Tudun (沓實力吐敦) was set to rebel. Zong Chuke, knowing that Tashili Tudun was faithful, opined that this must be a false report by Tashili Tudun's nephew Tashili Mozi (沓實力默子). Soon, news came that Tashili Mozi was the one who rebelled, and that he had been captured by joint forces of Tashili Tudun and Tang forces.

In 697, Zong was serving as deputy minister of defense (夏官侍郎, Xiaguan Shilang) when Wu Zetian gave him the designation of Tong Fengge Luantai Pingzhangshi (同鳳閣鸞臺平章事), making him a chancellor de facto. However, in 698, he was stripped of the chancellor designation, although he continued to serve as deputy minister of defense.

Around this time, he developed an enmity with his cousin Wu Yizong (武懿宗) the Prince of Henan (a grandson of Wu Zetian's uncle Wu Shiyi (武士逸)). Around the new year 699, while Zong Chuke was serving as Wenchang Zuo Cheng (文昌左丞), one of the secretaries general of the executive bureau (文昌臺, Wenchang Tai), Wu Yizong submitted articles of impeachment against him and Zong Jinqing, accusing them of corruption and building mansions of excessive luxury. Zong Chuke was demoted to be the military advisor to the prefect of Bo Prefecture (播州, roughly modern Zunyi, Guizhou), while Zong Jinqing was exiled to Feng Prefecture (峰州, roughly Vĩnh Phúc Province, Vietnam). (It did appear that the Zongs had overly luxurious mansions, for when Wu Zetian's only daughter Princess Taiping visited their mansions, she stated, "Once we look at their mansions, it is like we have not lived.")

After some time, Zong Chuke was allowed to move closer to the capital Luoyang, and he successively served as the prefect of Yu Prefecture (豫州, roughly modern Zhumadian, Henan), then deputy director of palace supplies (少府少監, Shaofu Shaojian), then prefect of Qi Prefecture (岐州, roughly modern Baoji, Shaanxi) and then Shan Prefecture (陝州, roughly modern Sanmenxia, Henan). He eventually became deputy minister of defense again, and in 704 was again made chancellor with the Tong Fengge Luantai Pingzhangshi designation. Later that year, however, he was accused of retaining a servant girl originally of Li Chongrun the Prince of Shao (Wu Zetian's grandson, whom she forced to commit suicide in 701), and he was demoted to be the commandant at Yuan Prefecture (原州, roughly modern Guyuan, Ningxia), as well as the commanding general of the army in the region.

== During Emperor Zhongzong's second reign ==
Wu Zetian was overthrown in a coup in 705, and Emperor Zhongzong was restored to the throne. Soon, his cousin Wu Sansi the Prince of Dejing became powerful as his trusted advisor and lover to his powerful wife Empress Wei. Zong Chuke was initially made the minister of husbandry (太僕卿, Taipu Qing), and soon, under Wu Sansi's advocacy, he was made the minister of defense (兵部尚書, Bingbu Shangshu), and Zong Jinqing was made the imperial architect (將作大臣, Jiangzuo Dachen). In 707, Emperor Zhongzong's son, Li Chongjun the Crown Prince, angry at insults thrown at him by his powerful sister Li Guo'er the Princess Anle and her husband Wu Chongxun (武崇訓, Wu Sansi's son) and LI Guo'er's repeated attempts to displace him to become crown princess, started a rebellion and killed Wu Sansi and Wu Chongxun. When he next approached the palace, hoping to arrest Empress Wei, Li Guo'er, and Consort Shangguan Wan'er (Emperor Zhongzong's concubine, who was also having an affair with Wu Sansi), Zong Chuke was one of the commanders of the forces defending against Li Chongjun's forces, and subsequently, when Li Chongjun was defeated, it was Zong who sent forces after him and, after he was killed by his own guards, returned his head to the capital Chang'an. It was further at Zong's request that Li Chongrun's head be presented to the caskets of Wu Sansi and Wu Chongxun. He soon became a member of Empress Wei's faction, and later that year, he led a group of officials in presenting Empress Wei with the honorific title of Empress Shuntianyisheng (順天翊聖皇后). Further, he and LI Guo'er tried to implicate Princess Taiping and Li Dan the Prince of Xiang (the former Emperor Ruizong) in Li Chongjun's plot, but at the advice of Xiao Zhizhong, Emperor Zhongzong stopped investigations against Li Dan and Princess Taiping. He was, however, successful in getting Emperor Zhongzong to exile the chancellor Wei Yuanzhong, whose son Wei Sheng (魏升) had been forced to participate in Li Chongjun's rebellion. Later that year, he was made a commanding general of the imperial guards and given the de facto designation of Tong Zhongshu Menxia Sanpin (同中書門下三品). However, he received praise from later historians when he, in 708, supported the proposal of the general Zhang Rendan in building three forts north of the Yellow River in order to control the local Tujue population, which was effective. (Zhang's proposal was opposed by most imperial officials, but Zong supported it strenuously, stating, "This will benefit the empire for 10,000 generations.") However, he was also criticized for his flattery of Emperor Zhongzong and Empress Wei, particularly his repeated presentation, either by himself or through proxy, of various signs of fortune purportedly showing that Emperor Zhongzong's line will last for 100 generations.

Also in 708, Zong was involved in an incident that would cause Suoge (娑葛), the chieftain of the Tuqishi (突騎施), to rebel. Suoge had in 706 succeeded his father Wuzhile (烏質勒), and Wuzhile's subordinate Juechuo Zhongjie (闕啜忠節) had been unwilling to submit to Suoge. Juechuo was, however, unable to prevail over Suoge, and he was set to give up his forces and go to the Tang capital Chang'an, when the Tang general Zhou Yiti (周以悌) suggested to him the idea of bribing Zong and his ally and fellow chancellor Ji Chuna to launch an attack against Suoge. Juechuo did so, and Zong, after Juechuo's bribery, proposed to Emperor Zhongzong the idea of attacking Suoge in alliance with Tufan, which Emperor Zhongzong agreed despite opposition by the general Guo Yuanzhen. Suoge heard of this plan and acted first, successfully attacking several Tang outposts and then sending an envoy to Chang'an to demand that Zong be executed. Subsequently, Guo reported the facts of the situation to Emperor Zhongzong, and Emperor Zhongzong sent a peace envoy to make peace with Suoge and creating him Shisixing Khan. Subsequently, in 709, the censor Cui Wan (崔琬) submitted articles of impeachment against Zong and Ji for corruption that led to disaster on the borders. The protocol at that time required that, as the articles of impeachment were read, that the accused officials step out of the palace and await imperial instructions, but Zong did not do so and, in anger, spoke to Emperor Zhongzong and stated that he was faithful and being falsely accused. Instead of investigating, Emperor Zhongzong ordered Zong and Cui swear to brotherhood with each other, causing the people to give Emperor Zhongzong the semi-derogatory epithet of "Peacemaking Son of Heaven."

Later in 709, Zong was made Zhongshu Ling (中書令, the new title for the head of the legislative bureau, now renamed Zhongshu Sheng (中書省)).

In 710, a low level official, Yan Qinrong (燕欽融) submitted an accusation to Emperor Zhongzong, stating that Empress Wei was committing adultery and that Li Guo'er, her second husband Wu Yanxiu (武延秀, also a nephew of Wu Zetian), and Zong were about to harm the imperial clan. Emperor Zhongzong summoned Yan to his presence and interrogated him, and Yan was insistent on his accusation. While Emperor Zhongzong was mulling over the matter, Zong had Yan killed, an act that, while Emperor Zhongzong did not punish him for, was displeased about, and this displeasure was said to begin to bring fear into the hearts of Empress Wei and her faction.

== Death ==
Soon thereafter, Emperor Zhongzong died suddenly—a death that traditional historians believed to be a poisoning carried out by Empress Wei and Li Guo'er, to allow Empress Wei to eventually become emperor and Li Guo'er to become crown princess. For the meantime, Empress Wei made Emperor Zhongzong's son by a concubine, Li Chongmao the Prince of Wei, emperor (as Emperor Shang), while retaining power as empress dowager and regent. Under the initial proposal by Consort Shangguan and Princess Taiping, a power balance would be achieved in that Li Dan would be made coregent, and Consort Shangguan drafted a will on Emperor Zhongzong's behalf to that effect, but after the will was given to Zong Chuke and Empress Dowager Wei's cousin Wei Wen, Wei Wen and Zong, pointing out that this would cause Empress Dowager Wei to lose some of the power, altered it such that Li Dan would not be coregent. Meanwhile, the members of the Wei clan, Zong, Wu Yanxiu, and other officials Zhao Lüwen (趙履溫) and Ye Jingneng (葉靜能) were said to be trying to persuade Empress Dowager Wei to take over as emperor, and finding ways to eliminate Li Dan and Princess Taiping.

However, Zong's friend Cui Riyong leaked this plan to Li Dan's son Li Longji the Prince of Linzi. Li Longji thereafter joined forces with Princess Taiping and her son Xue Chongjian (薛崇簡) and launched a coup, killing Empress Dowager Wei, Li Guo'er, and Wu Yanxiu. Zong put on mourning clothes (which included a white veil, thus covering his face) and tried to ride a donkey to flee. When he got to Tonghua Gate (通化門), one of Chang'an's city gates, the guard at the gate recognized him and tore off his veil. Zong was arrested and executed, as was his brother Zong Jinqing.

It was said that while Zong Chuke followed Empress Wei, he actually also had designs to be emperor, once telling his friends, "In the beginning, when I was in an inferior office, I wanted to be chancellor. Now that I am a chancellor, I want to be Son of Heaven, even if only for a day."

== Notes and references ==
- Old Book of Tang, vol. 92.
- New Book of Tang, vol. 109.
- Zizhi Tongjian, vols. 204, 206, 207, 208, 209.
