= Yibo =

Yibo Kutluk Bilge Juzhi 移撥骨咄祿毗伽俱支
- Khagan of the Turgesh
- Reign: 749–751
- Predecessor: El Etmish Kutluk Bilge
- Successor: Tengri Ermish Qaghan

Yibo (移拨) or Yiber Kutluk Bilge Koch (Chinese: 移撥骨咄祿毗伽俱支; pinyin: Yíbō Gǔduōlù Píjiā Jùzhī) — was a khagan of Turgesh acknowledged by Xuanzong between 18 August - 15 September 749. In 751, he was allied with the Abbasid Caliphate and Tibet against Tang general Gao Xianzhi and got captured by Chinese forces and taken to court. He was succeeded by Tengri Ermish Qaghan.
