= Su Ting =

Su Ting (蘇頲; 670 – July 26, 727), courtesy name Tingshuo (廷碩), formally Duke Wenxian of Xu (許文憲公), was an official of the Chinese Tang dynasty and Wu Zetian's Zhou dynasty, serving as a chancellor during the reign of Emperor Xuanzong. He was a capable supporting chancellor to Song Jing, and he was also immensely gifted literarily, ranking with Zhang Yue as the two great literary figures of their time. They were known in unison as 燕许大手笔 ("Immense pen-brushes from Yan and Xu").

== Background ==
Su Ting was born in 670, during the reign of Emperor Gaozong. At that time, his father Su Gui was serving on the staff of Emperor Gaozong's son Li Dan, the Prince of Yu. It was said that Su Ting was intelligent and handsome in his youth, and was able to remember and recite texts with 1,000 characters.

== During Wu Zetian's reign ==
During the reign of Emperor Gaozong's wife Wu Zetian, Su Ting passed the imperial examinations (before he was 19) and was made the magistrate of Wucheng County (烏程, in modern Huzhou, Jiangsu). He eventually became an imperial censor with the title Jiancha Yushi (監察御史). Late in her reign, during the Chang'an era (701–705), she had Su review the cases that her secret police official Lai Junchen had handled early in her reign which had resulted in many executions. Su was able to uncover many wrongful convictions and get people's honors posthumously restored.

== During Emperor Zhongzong's second reign ==
In 705, Wu Zetian was overthrown in a coup, and her son and crown prince Li Xian, a former emperor, returned to the throne (as Emperor Zhongzong). Su Ting was made an imperial attendant (給事中, Jishizhong) and an imperial scholar at Xiuwen Pavilion (修文館). He was soon made Zhongshu Sheren (中書舍人), a mid-level official at the legislative bureau of government (中書省, Zhongshu Sheng). Soon thereafter, Su Ting's father Su Gui was made chancellor, and the family was considered an exceedingly honored one. At that time, most official commissions were drafted by Su, and his language was considered very beautiful.

== During Emperor Shang's reign and Emperor Ruizong's second reign ==
In 710, Emperor Zhongzong died suddenly—a death that traditional historians believed to be a poisoning carried out by his powerful wife Empress Wei and her daughter Li Guo'er the Princess Anle, so that Empress Wei could become "emperor" like Wu Zetian and Li Guo'er could be crown princess. Meanwhile, Emperor Zhongzong's son Li Chongmao the Prince of Wen was named emperor (as Emperor Shang), but Empress Wei retained power as empress dowager and regent. Less than a month later, Empress Wei and Li Guo'er were killed in a coup led by Emperor Zhongzong's sister Princess Taiping and nephew Li Longji the Prince of Linzi. Li Longji's father Li Dan the Prince of Xiang, himself a former emperor, was initially named regent, and in the aftermaths of the coup, there were many commission and demotion orders to be written, with Su Ting in charge of drafting them. He was reading them so quickly to his scribe that the scribe commented, "Lord, please be slower. Otherwise, my wrist would be dislocated." The chancellor Li Jiao, who was Su Ting's superior and who was himself known for great literary talent, commented, "The Sheren thinks as fast as a gushing spring. I, Li Jiao, cannot compare to him." Soon, under the urging of Princess Taiping, Li Longji, and Li Longji's brother Li Chengqi, Li Dan took the throne himself (as Emperor Ruizong), displacing Emperor Shang. Sometime thereafter, Su Ting was made the deputy minister of worship (太常少卿, Taichang Shaoqing).

Later in 710, Su Gui died. Su Ting inherited the title of Duke of Xu and left government service to observe a mourning period for his father. Soon thereafter, Emperor Ruizong tried to recall him to government service as the deputy minister of public works (工部侍郎, Gongbu Shilang), which he declined—and when Emperor Ruizong sent the official Li Rizhi to visit Su Ting to urge him to return to government service, Li Rizhi saw that Su Ting's mourning was deep and genuine. Emperor Ruizong thus allowed Su Ting to serve out the traditional three-year mourning period.

== During Emperor Xuanzong's reign ==
In 712, Emperor Ruizong passed the throne to Li Longji, who took the throne as Emperor Xuanzong. Once Su Ting's mourning period was over, Emperor Xuanzong began considering where he could place Su. He considered making Su Zhongshu Shilang (中書侍郎), the deputy head of the legislative bureau, but was unsure whether there was a precedent, and so he asked the chancellors, "Is there precedent for someone to become Zhongshu Shilang from being Gongbu Shilang?" He received a response of, "Your Imperial Majesty should care about whether he is suitable, not precedent." Emperor Xuanzong thus made Su Zhongshu Shilang—and gave him the unprecedented honor of sharing the food normally served only to chancellors. At that time, Li Ai (李乂), who was also a capable writer, was also Zhongshu Shilang. Emperor Xuanzong thus commented to Su:

During the prior administration, Li Jiao and Su Weidao were known for their talent and were referred together as "Su and Li." Now that I have you and Li Ai, I can match that. You should make copies of the edicts that you draft for me and write your name on them, so that in the future I can review them for their wonderful language.

This started a precedent for officials who draft imperial edicts to also leave their names on the edicts for posterity. Subsequently, after Emperor Ruizong died in 716, Emperor Xuanzong wanted to build a stele at Emperor Ruizong's tomb Jingling (靖陵). Su opposed, pointing out that not only was it not fitting with tradition, but that if he did so, all of the prior emperors' tombs needed to be retroactively given steles. Emperor Xuanzong thus stopped the project.

Around the new year 717, Su, whose title had been changed to Ziwei Shilang (紫微侍郎) by that point due to a number of name changes in offices that Emperor Xuanzong instituted, was given the designation Tong Ziwei Huangmen Pingzhangshi (同紫微黃門平章事), making him a chancellor de facto. He worked well with the more senior chancellor Song Jing. It was said that Song was strict and often made the decisions that Su obeyed. Whenever Song made reports to Emperor Xuanzong, Su would make reports that supplemented Song's. Song once commented:

I have served with the Sus, both father and son, as chancellor. The Pushe [(i.e., Su Gui)] was senior and lenient, and was great support for the state. However, as far as making important decisions and being knowledgeable about governance, as well as being fair and impartial, Su Ting greatly exceeds his father.

Later in 717, there was a controversy over whether Emperors Zhongzong and Ruizong, as brothers, could both be worshipped at the ancestral temple. The officials in charge of worship, Chen Zhenjie (陳貞節), Feng Zong (馮宗), and Su Ting's cousin Su Xian (蘇獻), advocated moving Emperor Zhongzong's cult out of the imperial temple and having him worshipped at a separate temple, as they believed that the traditional requirement that the emperor worship seven ancestors referred to seven generations of ancestors, and that Emperors Zhongzong and Ruizong, of the same generation, thus constituted only one of the seven ancestors together. Sun Pingzi (孫平子), however, believed that this violated the principle that past emperors should all be worshipped. Because Su Xian was Su Ting's cousin, Su Ting advocated for him, and eventually his suggestion was accepted.

Over the next few years, Su concurred with Song on many matters of morality and governmental cleanliness, including:

- In winter 717, when Emperor Xuanzong requested that Song and Su submit a number of formal names and titles for his sons and daughters—but separately requested a set of particularly honorable names, presumably for a favorite son—Song and Su pointed out that this would be viewed as favoritism, and therefore submitted a group of names without any designation as to what were particularly honorable names.
- When Emperor Xuanzong's father-in-law Wang Renjiao (王仁皎) died, Wang Renjiao's son Wang Shouyi (王守一) requested that a tomb be built for Wang Renjiao that would be as large as Emperor Xuanzong's maternal grandfather Dou Xiaochen (竇孝諶), and Emperor Xuanzong initially agreed. Song and Su pointed out that Dou's tomb was already considered overly wasteful and should not be followed. Emperor Xuanzong agreed, and reduced the scale of Wang Renjiao's tomb.

By 720, however, Song's strictness would eventually bring his and Su's removal. Song had ordered that individuals who had repeatedly appealed their cases without cause be detained by the imperial censors, until they were willing to drop their appeals. This drew much anger from people. At that time, there happened to be a drought, which, according to popular beliefs at the time, would be accompanied by the appearance of a spirit known as the Hanba (旱魃). One day, while Emperor Xuanzong was watching a play, an actor dressed as the Hanba, and stated:

There are over 300 people saddled with unfair judgments. The chancellor has locked them all up, and therefore I am forced to appear.

Meanwhile, further, Song and Su were strictly prohibiting the use of damaged coins, which they had tried to replace with newly minted coins. However, the damaged coins were still in circulation despite the prohibition, particularly in the region between the Yangtze River and the Huai River. Song sent the imperial censor Xiao Yinzhi (蕭隱之) to the region to be in charge of collecting the damaged coins and taking them out of circulation. Xiao was strict in his behavior, drawing much resentment. Emperor Xuanzong, when he heard this, demoted Xiao, and in spring 720 removed Song and Su from their chancellor posts, making Su the minister of rites (禮部尚書, Libu Shangshu) instead. He replaced Song and Su with Yuan Qianyao and Zhang Jiazhen.

In 725, when Emperor Xuanzong suspected that the civil service selections were not done properly, he commissioned 10 officials, including Su, to reexamine the official commissions of that year, against advice that doing so undermined the authority of the civil service affairs ministry, although he stopped doing this in 726. Also in 725, when Emperor Xuanzong offered sacrifices to heaven and earth at Mount Tai, he had Su draft the text of the monument there.

It was said that Su was frugal and did not care about money—and that he shared his salaries with his younger brothers and family members, with no savings left. He died in 727. Initially, there was no posthumous honors given to him. The official Wei Shu (韋述) submitted a petition pointing out Su's contributions, and Emperor Xuanzong, in response, bestowed posthumous honors on Su.

== Notes and references ==
- Old Book of Tang, vol.88.
- New Book of Tang, vol.125.
- Zizhi Tongjian, vols. 207, 210, 211, 212, 213.
