= Guo Yuanzhen =

Chinese Tang dynasty official (656-713)

Guo Yuanzhen (郭元振; 656–713), formal name Guo Zhen (郭震) but went by the courtesy name of Yuanzhen, was an official, general, and diplomat of Tang and Zhou dynasties of China, serving as a chancellor during the reigns of Emperor Ruizong and Emperor Xuanzong.

== Background ==
Guo Yuanzhen was born in 656, during the reign of Emperor Gaozong. He was said to be tall and handsome, with a beautiful beard in his youth, as well as ambitious. In 671, he became a student at the imperial university, at the same time that future fellow chancellors Xue Ji and Zhao Yanzhao where. On one occasion, when Guo's family had just sent him spending money, a man who was wearing mourning clothes approached him and asked him for financial help to bury his ancestors, claiming that his ancestors had not been properly buried for five generations. Guo generously gave the man money without asking further questions, impressing Xue and Zhao, who were present at the time. In 673, he passed the imperial examinations and was made the sheriff of Tongquan County (通泉, in modern Suining, Sichuan). It was said that while serving at Tongquan, he was a maverick and did not pay attention to details.

== During Wu Zetian's reign ==
Around or before 696, when Guo Yuanzhen was still at Tongquan, he captured over 1000 local tribespeople and sold them as slaves so that he could have funds to maintain his guests, and the people of Tongquan were distressed. When then-reigning Wu Zetian (Emperor Gaozong's wife) heard of this, she summoned Guo to the capital Luoyang, intending to punish him. When she met him, however, she was impressed by his talent, and she asked him for his past writing. He submitted an essay that he had written about swords, and she was further impressed and showed the essay to the imperial scholar Li Jiao, himself known for his literary talent. She made him Zhoucao Canjun (冑曹參軍), a logistics officer with the imperial guards, as well as an imperial attendant. At that time, the Tibetan Empire claimed to be seeking peace with Wu Zetian's Zhou dynasty, and she sent Guo as an emissary to the Tibetan Empire to discuss the matter. After he arrived, the Tibetan regent Gar Trinring Tsendro (Chinese: 論欽陵) offered peace, but demanded that Zhou withdraw the forces at the four garrisons under the Protectorate General to Pacify the West and cede some of the 10 former tribes of the Western Turkic Khaganate to the Tibetan Empire. After returning to Luoyang, Guo suggested to Wu Zetian that she respond that she was willing to agree to Lun's requests—as long as the Tibetan Empire was willing to cede territory around the Qinghai Lake, formerly belonging to Tuyuhun—conditions that he knew Trinring would not agree to. He further suggested that she sent emissaries to the Tibetan Empire each year to offer peace, to cause the Tibetan people to resent Trinring for not agreeing to the conditions for peace.

In 699, the Tibetan emperor Tridu Songtsen, unhappy that Trinring was monopolizing power, took an opportunity when Trinring was away from the capital Lhasa to slaughter Trinring's associates. He then defeated Trinring in battle, and Trinring committed suicide. Trinring's brother Gar Tsenba (Chinese: 論贊婆) and Trinring's son Lun Gongren (Chinese: 論弓仁) surrendered to Zhou. Wu Zetian sent Guo and Fumeng Linqing (夫蒙令卿) to welcome them. She also made Guo Zhuke Langzhong (主客郎中), an official at the ministry of rites in charge of managing visits by foreign ambassadors and maintaining the households of the descendants of the rulers of prior dynasties.

In 701, Guo was made the commandant at Liang Prefecture (涼州, roughly modern Wuwei, Gansu). It was said that previously, Göktürk and Tibetan forces would often pillage the prefecture, and that fields outside the capital city of the prefecture were often laid waste. Guo ordered the building of two outposts, Baiting Base (白亭軍) to the north, and Herong (和戎) to the south, to serve as warning posts and as counterattack points. Thereafter, the raids decreased, and the people were able to have more rest. He also ordered his subordinate Li Hantong (李漢通) the prefect of Gan Prefecture (甘州, roughly modern Jiuquan, Gansu), to build irrigation and promote farming. This allowed the region, which previously had a food shortage, to have food surplus, allowing the military to be supported. It was generally said that Guo was good at managing the people and governing the troops, and that for the five years when he was at Liang Prefecture, both the Han and the non-Han loved and obeyed him, and that the people began to be wealthy.

== During Emperor Zhongzong's second reign ==
Wu Zetian was overthrown in a coup in 705, and her son and crown prince Li Xian, a former emperor, returned to the throne (as Emperor Zhongzong). Sometime thereafter, Guo was made the Protectorate General to Pacify the West. In 706, he went to the Tuqishi (突騎施) tribe to meet with its chieftain Wuzhile (烏質勒) to discuss military matters. They met outside Wuzhile's tent, and It was cold and snowing at the time, but Guo did not move. Wuzhile, however, was old and could not stand the cold; he died shortly after the meeting. Wuzhile's son Suoge (娑葛), believing that Guo's acts were deliberate, gathered his troops and got ready to attack Guo. Guo's deputy Jie Wan (解琬) became aware of this and suggested that they flee. Guo declined—stating that he felt that he needed to show sincerity, and that given that they were deep in Tuqishi territory, they could not get away anyway. The next day, he went to mourn Wuzhile, and showed sincere emotions in doing so. Suoge was touched and made peace with him.

Meanwhile, Wuzhile's subordinate Juechuo Zhongjie (闕啜忠節) was unwilling to submit to Suoge. Juechuo was, however, unable to prevail over Suoge, and in 708, at Guo's suggestion, he was set to give up his forces and go to the Tang capital Chang'an, when the Tang general Zhou Yiti (周以悌) suggested to him the idea of bribing the chancellors Zong Chuke and Ji Chuna to launch an attack against Suoge. Juechuo did so, and Zong, after Juechuo's bribery, proposed to Emperor Zhongzong the idea of attacking Suoge in alliance with the Tibetan Empire, which Emperor Zhongzong agreed despite Guo's opposition. Suoge heard of this plan and acted first, successfully attacking several Tang outposts and then sending an envoy to Chang'an to demand that Zong be executed. Subsequently, Guo reported the facts of the situation to Emperor Zhongzong, which led to Zong's accusing him of treason. However, Emperor Zhongzong agreed with Guo and sent a peace envoy to make peace with Suoge and creating him Shisixing Khan.

== During Emperor Ruizong's second reign ==
In 710, Emperor Zhongzong died suddenly—a death traditional historians believed to be a poisoning by his powerful wife Empress Wei and daughter Li Guo'er the Princess Anle. Emperor Zhongzong's son by a concubine, Li Chongmao the Prince of Wen took the throne (as Emperor Shang), but Empress Wei retained power as empress dowager and regent. Less than a month later, a coup led by Emperor Zhongzong's sister Princess Taiping and nephew Li Longji the Prince of Linzi killed Empress Dowager Wei and Li Guo'er. Li Longji's father Li Dan the Prince of Xiang, himself a former emperor, returned to the throne (as Emperor Ruizong), displacing Emperor Shang. He recalled Guo to the capital Chang'an to serve as minister of agriculture. In 711, he gave Guo the designation Tong Zhongshu Menxia Pingzhangshi (同中書門下平章事), making Guo a chancellor de facto. Later in the year, though, as a part of a government reorganization, he and the other chancellors were removed from their chancellor posts, and he was made the minister of civil service affairs (吏部尚書, Libu Shangshu), although he was also created the Baron of Guantao.

== During Emperor Xuanzong's reign ==
In 712, Emperor Ruizong passed the throne to Li Longji, who took the throne as Emperor Xuanzong, but retained power as Taishang Huang (retired emperor). Subsequently, Guo Yuanzhen was made the commandant of the forces of the Suofang region (i.e., modern Ningxia and northern Shaanxi) and the minister of defense (兵部尚書, Bingbu Shangshu). In 713, he was again made chancellor with the designation Tong Zhongshu Menxia Sanpin (同中書門下三品).

As of 713, Emperor Xuanzong and Princess Taiping were locked into a power struggle. It was said that Princess Taiping, Dou Huaizhen, Cen Xi, Xiao Zhizhong, Cui Shi; along with other officials Xue Ji, Li Jin (李晉) the Prince of Xinxing (a grandson of Li Deliang (李德良), a cousin of Tang's founder Emperor Gaozu), Li You (李猷), Jia Yingfu (賈膺福), Tang Jun (唐晙); the generals Chang Yuankai (常元楷), Li Ci (李慈), and Li Qin (李欽); and the monk Huifan (惠範), were plotting to overthrow Emperor Xuanzong. It was further said that they discussed, with the lady-in-waiting Lady Yuan to poison the gastrodia elata that Emperor Xuanzong routinely took as an aphrodisiac. When this alleged plot was reported to Emperor Xuanzong by Wei Zhigu, Emperor Xuanzong, who had already received advice from Wang Ju (王琚), Zhang Shuo, and Cui Riyong to act first, did so. He convened a meeting with his brothers Li Fan (李範) the Prince of Qi, Li Ye (李業) the Prince of Xue, Guo, along with a number of his associates — the general Wang Maozhong (王毛仲), the officials Jiang Jiao (姜皎) and Li Lingwen (李令問), his brother-in-law Wang Shouyi (王守一), the eunuch Gao Lishi, and the military officer Li Shoude (李守德) — and decided to act first. On July 29, Emperor Xuanzong had Wang Maozhong take 300 soldiers to the imperial guard camp to behead Chang and Li Ci. Then, Jia, Li You, Xiao, and Cen were arrested and executed as well. Dou and Princess Taiping committed suicide. When Emperor Ruizong heard about the incident, he ascended the tower at Chengtian Gate (承天門) to try to ascertain what was happening, and it was Guo who informed him what happened. Emperor Ruizong subsequently yieldedpowers to Emperor Xuanzong and no longer actively participated in policy decisions thereafter. It was said that during the crisis, Guo spent 14 nights at the legislative bureau (中書省, Zhongshu Sheng) without returning home. For his contributions, he was created the Duke of Dai and awarded silk, and further given the additional post as chief imperial censor (御史大夫, Yushi Daifu).

In winter 713, when Emperor Xuanzong was examining the troops, he was angry that the troops were disorganized, and he had Guo and the official Tang Shao (唐紹) arrested and ordered them executed, in order to try to show his power—but did not actually intend to kill them. However, the general Li Miao (李邈) executed Tang and was set to execute Guo, when fellow chancellors Liu Youqiu and Zhang Shuo kneeled and begged forgiveness on Guo's part, pointing out Guo's great contributions. Emperor Xuanzong thus exiled Guo to Xin Prefecture (新州, roughly modern Yunfu, Guangdong). He soon moved Guo to be the military advisor to the prefect of Rao Prefecture (饒州, roughly modern Shangrao, Jiangxi), but Guo, depressed over his exile, died on the way.
