= Saqal (Turgesh Khagan) =

Suoge 娑葛
- Turgesh Qaghan
- Reign: 706 – 711
- Predecessor: Wuzhile
- Successor: Suluk
- Died: 711; Battle of Bolchu
- Father: Wuzhile
- Religion: Manichaeist

Saqal (Chinese: 娑葛) was a Turgesh Qaghan. According to Yuri Zuev, he was a Manichaeist so that his name was possibly derived from Manichean theonym Sakla which means "Creator of the World". Other reconstructions are Saqal and Soq.

== Early reign ==
Suoge succeeded his father, Wuzhile, to the Turgesh throne. However, the Tang court did not acknowledge him as a Khagan, and instead, appointed him as Commander of the Walu Province (嗢鹿州都督). They gave him the title of Prince of Huaide (懷徳郡王), which made him a subordinate of Ashina Huaidao (who was Shixing Qaghan). Later, the deputy of Guo Yuanzhen, Jie Wan (解琬), was sent to bestow him with the title of Prince of Jinhe (金河郡王) in 708.

== Conflict with Tang ==
Eventually, the relationship between Suoge and the Tang court deteriorated. Suoge's subordinate, Juechuo Zhongjie (闕啜忠節), rebelled to his command, but was unable to prevail. At the suggestion of Guo Yuanzhen, in 708, he was set to give up his military forces and return to Chang'an, the Tang capital. The Tang general Zhou Yiti (周以悌) persuaded Juechuo to bribe chancellors Zong Chuke and Ji Chuna into launching an attack against Suoge. Juechuo did so and succeeded. Zong, after Juechuo's bribery, proposed to Emperor Zhongzong the idea of attacking Suoge in alliance with the Tibetan Empire, to which Emperor Zhongzong agreed, despite Guo's opposition. The Emperor appointed Ashina Xian (a son of Ashina Yuanqing) as Shixing Qaghan and sent him to capture Suyab. The attack did not succeed. Zhongjie was captured and Xian was defeated by Suoge.

Suoge's brother, Zhenu (遮努), gathered an army of 20,000 members and successfully attacked several Tang outposts – Kucha, Bohuan (modern Aksu, Xinjiang), Yanqi and Yingzhan. As Guo was hesitant to send an army to Shule, Suoge grew more self-reliant and declared himself as Khagan. Later, Suoge sent an envoy to Chang'an to demand that Zong be executed after wreaking havoc to Anxi. As a response, Guo was replaced by Zhou Yiti. Meanwhile, Suoge sent a letter claiming his innocence to Guo. In turn, Guo reported the facts of the situation to Emperor Zhongzong, which led to the Zongs accusing him of treason. However, Emperor Zhongzong agreed with Guo and sent an envoy to make peace with Suoge and make him Shisixing Qaghan (Chinese: 十四姓可汗; lit. 'Khan of Fourteen Tribes') in 709. Meanwhile, he also sent Zhou Yiti to exile in Baizhou.

== End of reign ==
According to Takeshi Osawa, the mediator that sent in the peace envoy to Suoge was Kyrgyz Khaganate's ruler, Bars Bek – a Khagan closely controlled by Qapaghan Qaghan, who was a brother-in-law to future Bilge Qaghan. Bars Bek secretly plotted a triple alliance with Tang and Turgesh, but Tonyukuk heard his plans, with help of Zhenu (遮努), Suoge's brother, who rebelled against him and deserted to the Second Turkic Khaganate. Tonyukuk made a surprise attack on Kirghiz at night in the year 710. Bars Bek was killed and Tonyukuk later headed on to Turgesh. However, Qapaghan's khatun died soon, which caused the khagan to order a halt to the attack. Suoge used this opportunity to move ahead, only to see Tonyukuk change his mind and disobey the order, ambushing Suoge. After a disastrous defeat at Bolchu, he was executed by future Bilge Qaghan. His lands were given as an appanage to Inal, son of Qapaghan.
