= Tengri Ermish Qaghan =

Tengri Eylemish or Tengri Ermish 登里伊罗蜜施
- Khagan of the Turgesh
- Reign: 753–755
- Predecessor: Yibo
- Successor: Ata Boyla Qaghan

Tengri Eylemish or Tengri Ermish Qaghan (Chinese: 登里伊罗蜜施; pinyin: Dēnglǐ Yīluómìshī) was the penultimate khagan of Turgesh.

== Reign ==
He was acknowledged as khagan by Xuanzong in October 753. He was a member of the Black Turgesh tribe.
