= Kül-chor =

- Khagan of the Turgesh
- Reign: 739–744
- Predecessor: Kut Chor
- Successor: El Etmish Kutluk Bilge
- Died: 744

Kül-chor, (Old Turkic: Küli Čur), known in Arabic sources as Kūrṣūl (كورصول) and identified with the Baga Tarkhan (Chinese: 莫贺达干; pinyin: Mòhè Dágān) of the Chinese records, was one of the main Turgesh leaders under the khagan Suluk. He is chiefly known for his role in the Turgesh wars against the Umayyad Caliphate in Transoxiana, and for being responsible for the murder of Suluk in 738, precipitating the collapse of Turgesh power. After eliminating his rivals, he rose to become khagan himself, but soon fell out with his Chinese backers and was defeated and executed in 744. Some Arabic sources, however, record that he was killed by the Arabs in 739.

== Origin ==
Along with the khagan himself—Suluk Chabish-chor or Su-Lu of the Chinese sources—Kül-chor, or "Kūrṣūl al-Turqashī" in Arabic, is one of only two Turgesh leaders to be mentioned by name in the Arab sources of the period. Kül-chor, usually identified with the Baga Tarkhan (pinyin: Mohe dagan quelü chuo) of Chinese sources, was the leader of a small Turkic tribe, known in the Chinese sources as Chumukun (处木昆), living south of Lake Balkash between Turgesh and Qarluq lands.

== Wars against the Arabs ==
Kül-chor first appears in spring 721, when, following the calls for aid of the Soghdian princes of Transoxiana against the expansion of the Umayyad Caliphate, he was sent to lead the first Turgesh attack on the Umayyad Arabs. Despite a setback at the fortress of Qasr al-Bahili, Kül-chor proceeded to raid deep into Transoxiana, mostly with the aid of the local population and their princes. Samarkand, which was too strong to be assaulted, was bypassed, but when at long last the unwarlike Umayyad governor, Sa'id al-Khudhayna, marched to meet him, Kül-chor inflicted a heavy defeat on the Arabs, and forced Sa'id to confine himself in the neighbourhood of Samarkand. Despite their success, however, the whole operation seems to have been, in the words of H.A.R. Gibb, "little more than a reconnaissance in force combined with a raiding expedition", and the Turgesh withdrew soon after, allowing the new Arab governor, Sa'id ibn Amr al-Harashi, to brutally suppress the local rebels and re-impose Arab authority on most of the region. Kül-chor appears again in the Siege of Kamarja in 729, when he was one of the high-ranking Turgesh hostages given to the Arab garrison of Kamarja as guarantee of safe passage.

In December 737, Suluk suffered a personal defeat in the Battle of Kharistan, which greatly diminished his prestige. Kül-chor had him assassinated, probably with backing from the Chinese, who had a history of troubled relations with Suluk. As a result, the Turgesh khaganate broke up into two warring factions, the "Yellow" and "Black", which struggled for power over the next two decades. The ensuing collapse of Turgesh power meant the disappearance of "the last great Turkish confederation in Western Asia for more than two centuries to come" (Gibb), leaving the path open for the Arabs to impose their rule on Transoxiana.

== Usurpation and death ==
Kül-chor and his faction allied with the Chinese general Gai Jiayun against Suluk's son and successor, Kut-chor, or Tuhuoxian in Chinese sources. Aided by his Transoxianian allies from Ishkand, Shash and Ferghana, in 739 Kül-chor defeated and captured his rival at Suyab. Soon after, Kül-chor was acclaimed as khagan and Kut-chor was exiled to China, where he was symbolically put to death in the imperial temple, before being given an honorary commission and allowed to live off his days at the Chinese court.

Already from the beginning of his reign, Kül-chor's relation with his Chinese overlords was strained, as the Chinese court supported a candidate of its own, Ashina Xian, for the khaganate. In the event, Kül-chor drove off Ashina Xin and assumed the khaganate, forcing the Chinese to recognize the fait accompli. Soon however Kül-chor broke with the Chinese altogether, and in 742 he had Ashina Xian assassinated. As a result, in 744 the Chinese general Fumeng Lingcha campaigned against Kül-chor, defeated and executed him. He was followed by Tumodu, now styled El Etmish Kutlug Bilge.

== Aftermath ==
After this, Turgesh power continued to decline amid internecine warfare, until, in 766, the Qarluqs killed the last Turgesh khagans and supplanted them as masters of the region of Zhetysu.

Later Arab sources on the other hand attribute Kül-chor's capture and execution to the last Umayyad governor of Khurasan, Nasr ibn Sayyar, in 739. Gibb, however, argues that if he is to be identified with Baga Tarkhan, this cannot possibly be true, and that this tale is probably an exaggerated re-telling of the actual capture and execution of another, lesser Turkish leader by Nasr.

== Sources ==
- Barthold, V. V. (1956). Four Studies on the History of Central Asia. Leiden: Brill. OCLC 6132625.
- Blankinship, Khalid Yahya, ed. (1989). The History of al-Ṭabarī, Volume XXV: The End of Expansion: The Caliphate of Hishām, A.D. 724–738/A.H. 105–120. SUNY Series in Near Eastern Studies. Albany, New York: State University of New York Press. ISBN 978-0-88706-569-9.
- Blankinship, Khalid Yahya (1994). The End of the Jihâd State: The Reign of Hishām ibn ʻAbd al-Malik and the Collapse of the Umayyads. Albany, New York: State University of New York Press. ISBN 978-0-7914-1827-7.
- Gibb, H. A. R. (1923). The Arab Conquests in Central Asia. London: The Royal Asiatic Society.
- Grousset, René (1970). The Empire of the Steppes: A History of Central Asia. New Brunswick, NJ: Rutgers University Press. ISBN 0-8135-1304-9.
- Hillenbrand, Carole, ed. (1989). The History of al-Ṭabarī, Volume XXVI: The Waning of the Umayyad Caliphate: Prelude to Revolution, A.D. 738–744/A.H. 121–126. SUNY Series in Near Eastern Studies. Albany, New York: State University of New York Press. ISBN 978-0-88706-810-2.
- Kennedy, Hugh (2007). The Great Arab Conquests: How the Spread of Islam Changed the World We Live In. Philadelphia, PA: Da Capo Press. ISBN 978-0-306-81740-3.
- Sinor, D.; Klyashtorny, S. G. (1996). "The Türk Empire". In Litvinsky, B. A. (ed.). History of civilizations of Central Asia, Volume III: The crossroads of civilizations: A.D. 250 to 750. Paris: UNESCO Publishing. pp. 327–348. ISBN 92-3-103211-9.
- Skaff, Jonathan Karam (2012). Sui-Tang China and Its Turko-Mongol Neighbors: Culture, Power, and Connections, 580–800. Oxford University Press. ISBN 0199734135.
- Stark, Sören (2016). "Türgesh Khaganate". In McKenzie, John M.; Dalziel, Nigel R.; Charney, Michael W.; Doumanis, Nicholas (eds.). Encyclopedia of Empire, Volume IV: S–Z. Chichester: Wiley Blackwell. pp. 2122–2127.
