= Türgesh =

699–766 Turkic tribal confederation of Central Asia

Türgesh Khaganate 𐱅𐰇𐰼𐰏𐰾
- 699–766
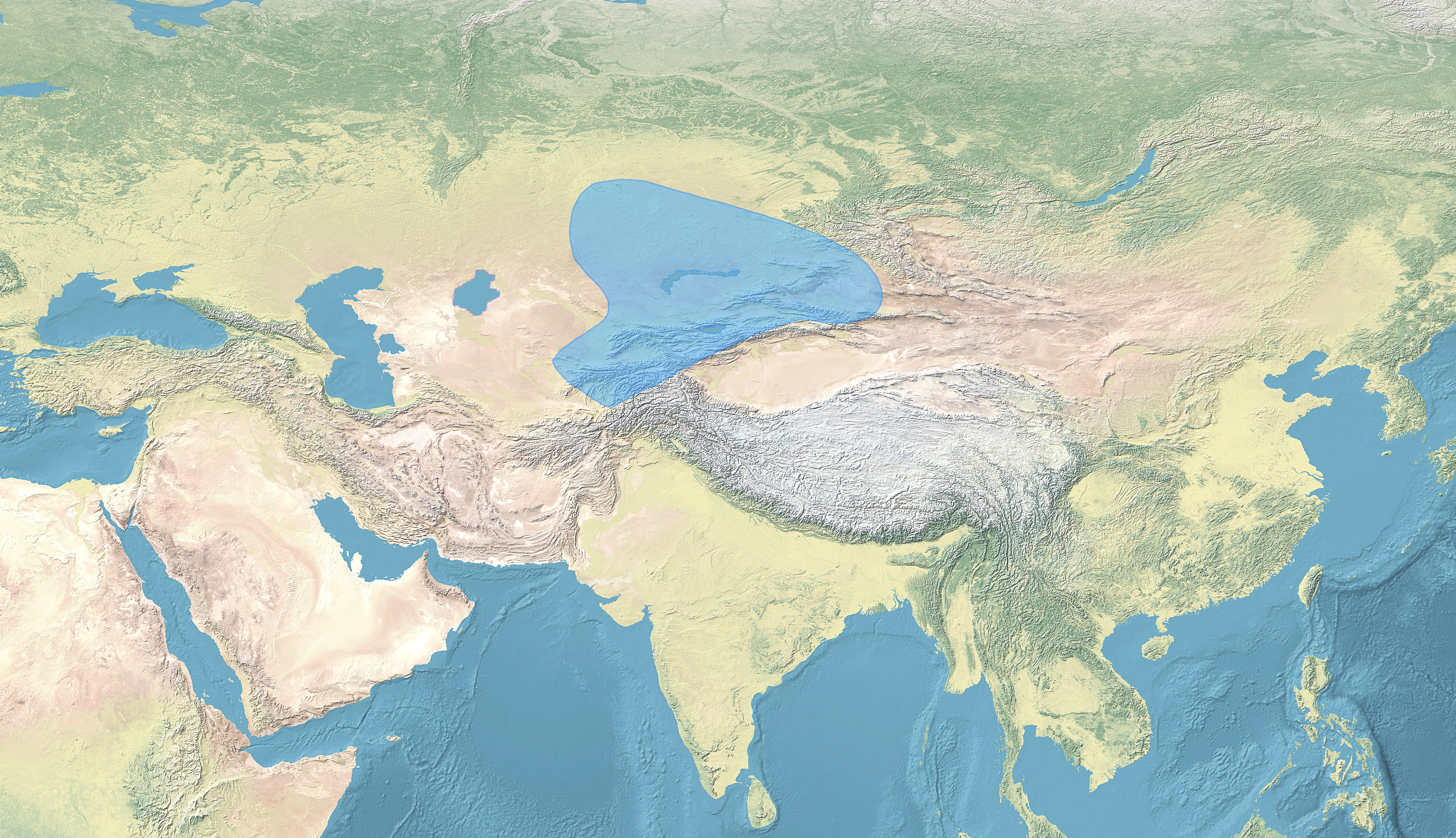
- Approximate territory of the Second Turkic Khaganate and main contemporary Asian polities, c. 720

- Approximate borders of Türgesh Khaganate (white line). (Note: Wuzhile ruled over the territory from Chach to Turfan and Beshbaliq. The boundary on the south was established at the Oxus river, but Samarkand and Bukhara were lost c. 710. Khiva was part of Khwarezm. Aksu (along with the principality of Farghana) was under Western Turk rule up to 657. Above Beshbaliq, the border might be at the Altay mountain range. From there onwards, the Türgesh might control the upper Irtysh, Ob, and Tobol regions to oversee the local fur hunting business. This is supported by some archaeological sources of the ancient Hungarians (△), provided by Manichean symbolism, like Srostki (c. 766-780) and Zevakino (c. 9-10th century), and the Türkish language Yenisey inscriptions also grouping there. The Turks/Türgesh (according to one opinion) might also settle some Chigils from the area of Chach in the Kama-Belaya region, who later became the Szeklers. This is also supported by some archaeological sources of the ancient Hungarians provided by Buddhist symbolism, like Redikor (7-9th century) and Ishimbay.)
- Status: Khaganate
- Capital: Taraz; Suyab
- Common languages: Old Turkic
- Religion: Tengrism
- Türgesh Kagans
  - 699–706: Üch Elig
  - c. 750–766: Ata Boyla Qaghan
- Historical era: Early Middle Ages
  - Established: 699
  - Disestablished: 766
Preceded by	Succeeded by
Western Turkic Khaganate; Second Turkic Khaganate	Karluk Yabghu; Oghuz Yabgu State

The Türgesh or Türgish (Old Turkic: 𐱅𐰇𐰼𐰏𐰾:𐰉𐰆𐰑𐰣, romanized: Türügeš budun, lit. 'Türgesh people'; simplified Chinese: 突骑施; traditional Chinese: 突騎施; pinyin: Tūqíshī; Wade–Giles: T'u-ch'i-shih; Old Tibetan: Du-rgyas) were a Turkic tribal confederation. Once belonging to the Duolu wing of the Western Turkic On Oq elites, Türgeshes emerged as an independent power after the demise of the Western Turks and established a khaganate in 699. The Türgesh Khaganate lasted until 766 when the Karluks defeated them. Türgesh and Göktürks were related through marriage.

== Name ==
Tekin (1968) and Atwood (2013) etymologize the ethnonym Türgiş as containing a gentilic suffix -ş affixed onto the name of lake Türgi-Yarğun, which was mentioned in Kültegin inscription.

== Tribal composition ==
By the 7th century, two or three sub-tribes were recorded: "Yellow" Sarï Türgesh tribe Alishi (阿利施) and the "Black" Qara Türgesh tribe(s) 娑葛 (Suoge < *Soq or *Saqal) - 莫賀 (Mohe < *Bağa). To the Black Türgesh sub-tribe, Chebishi (車鼻施) (*çavïş, from Old Turkic 𐰲𐰉𐰾 *çabïş or Sogdian čapīş "chief"), belonged 8th century Türgesh chor and later khagan Suluk. The Turgesh Khaganate also contained remnants of the Western Turkic Khaganate: Suluk's subordinate Kül-chor belonged to the Duolu tribe Chumukun (處木昆), who lived south of Lake Balkash between Türgesh and Qarluq. Tang general Geshu Han was of Duolu Turgesh extraction and bore the Nushibi tribal surname Geshu (阿舒). Chinese historians, when naming the Duolu Turk tribes, might mention Khalajes along with the Türgesh, under the common appellation 突騎施-賀羅施 (Mand. Tūqíshī-hèluóshī; reconstructed Old Turkic *Türgeş-Qalaç).

A late-7th century Uyghur chief was also surnamed Türgesh.

== Timeline ==
=== Foundation of the Turgesh Khaganate ===
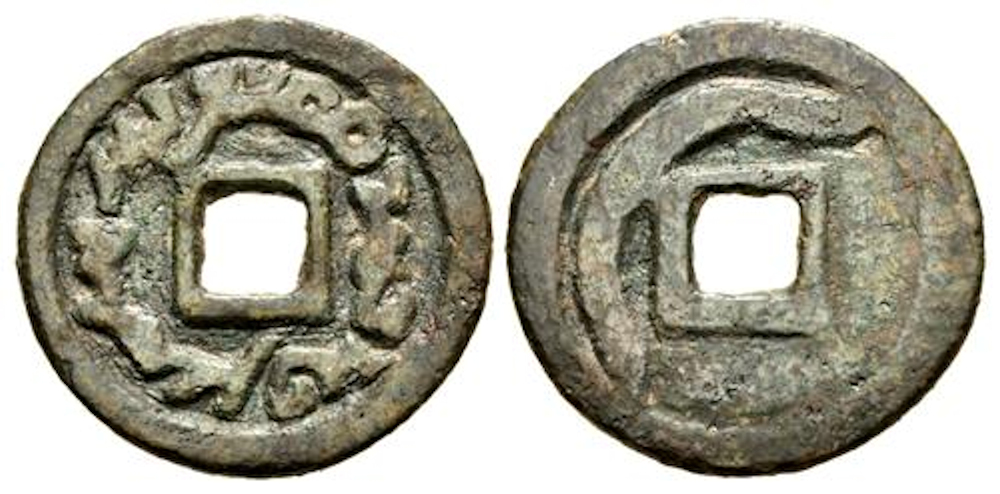
Coin of the Türgesh Kaghans. Early–mid 8th century CE. Semirech'e. Obverse: Sogdian legend around central square hole. Reverse: Curved tamgha around central square hole.

Prior to independence, the Turgesh were ruled by a subordinate tutuk, later shad, of the Western Turkic Khaganate's Onoq elites. Turgesh leaders belonged to Duolu division and held the title chur. A Turgesh commander of the Talas district and the town of Balu possessed a name symbolizing some sacred relation to a divine or heavenly sphere. The first Turgesh Kaghan Wuzhile (Chinese transcription 烏質 Wuzhi means "black substance") was a leader of a Manichaean consortium known as yüz er "hundred men". He established the Turgesh Khaganate in 699. He had driven out the Tang protégé Böri Shad. In 703 he captured Suyab and set up his authority on the territory from Chach to Turfan and Beshbaliq. In 706 his son Saqal succeeded him. Both khagans had a church rank of Yuzlik according to Yuri Zuev.

Saqal attacked the Tang city of Qiuci (Kucha) in 708 and inflicted a defeat on the Tang in 709. However Saqal's younger brother Zhenu rebelled and sought military support from the Qapagan Khaghan of the Second Turkic Khaganate in 708. Qapaghan Khagan defeated the Turgesh in 711 in the Battle of Bolchu, and killed both Saqal and Zhenu. The defeated Turgesh fled to Zhetysu. In 714 the Turgesh elected Suluk as their khagan.

From the west, the Türgesh were threatened by the conquering Arab armies, who crossed the Syr Darya (Jaxartes) several times in 714–715. This compelled Suluk to join battle with the Arabs, along with other Central Asian states, striving to retain their independence.

=== Timeline of Suluk ===
In 720 Turgesh forces led by Kül-chor defeated Umayyad forces led by Sa'id ibn Abdu'l-Aziz near Samarkand.

In 722 Suluk married the Ashina Princess Jiaohe.

In 724 Caliph Hisham sent a new governor to Khorasan, Muslim ibn Sa'id, with orders to crush the "Turks" once and for all, but, confronted by Suluk on the so-called "Day of Thirst", Muslim hardly managed to reach Samarkand with a handful of survivors, as the Turgesh raided freely.

In 726 the Turgesh attacked Qiuci (Kucha).

In 727 the Turgesh and the Tibetan Empire attacked Qiuci (Kucha).

In 728 Suluk defeated Umayyad forces while aiding the Sogdians in their rebellion, and took Bukhara.

In 731 the Turgesh were defeated at the Battle of the Defile by the Arabs, who suffered enormous casualties.

In 735 the Turgesh attacked Ting Prefecture (Jimsar County).

In 737 (winter) Suluk, along with his allies al-Harith, Gurak (a Sogdian leader) and men from Usrushana, Tashkent and the Khuttal attacked the Umayyads. He entered Jowzjan, but was defeated by the Umayyad governor Asad at the Battle of Kharistan.

=== Kül-chor ===
Following his defeat Suluk was murdered by his relative Kül-chor. Immediately, the Turgesh Khaganate was plunged into a civil war between the Black (Kara) and Yellow (Sary) factions. Kül-chor of the Sary Turgesh vanquished his rival Tumoche of the Kara Turgesh. In 740 Kül-chor submitted to the Tang dynasty but rebelled anyway when he killed the Turgesh puppet sent by the Tang court in 742. He was then captured and executed by the Tang in 744. The last Turgesh ruler declared himself a vassal of the recently established Uyghur Khaganate. In 766 the Karluks conquered Zhetysu and ended the Turgesh Khaganate.

== Legacy ==
Tuhsi and Azi might be remnants of the Türgesh, according to Gardizi, as well as Khalaj. The Turgesh-associated tribe Suoge, alongsides Chuyue and Anqing, participated in the ethnogenesis of Shatuo Turks.

According to Baskakov, the ethnonym Türgesh survives in the name of the seok Tirgesh among Altaians.

== List of Türgesh Khagans ==
1. Wuzhile (699–706)
2. Suoge (706–711)
3. Suluk (716–738)
4. Kut Chor (738–739)
5. Kül Chor (739–744)
6. El Etmish Kutluk Bilge (744–749)
7. Yibo Kutluk Bilge Juzhi (749–751)
8. Tengri Ermish (753–755)
9. Ata Boyla (750s – 766)
