= Suluk (Türgesh khagan) =

8th-century Turkic leader

Suluk 苏禄可汗
- Türgesh Qaghan
- Reign: 716 – 738
- Predecessor: Suoge
- Successor: Kut Chor
- Died: 738; Suyab
- Issue: Kut Chor
- Religion: Tengrism

Suluk, Sul-lu or Sulu (?-738) was a Türgesh tribal leader and a Qaghan who defended Transoxiana against Umayyad conquest in the early 8th century.

== Background ==
Türgesh was a park of confederation known as On-Oq Turks, (a group of tribes) around Transoxiana. Initially, their territory was a part of the First Turkic Khaganate, then part of Western Turkic Qaghanate. After defeat of the Western Turkic Khaganate by the Tang dynasty in 658 resulted in the creation of puppet khaganates under the Jimi system. The Türgesh chieftains Wuzhile and his son Suoge were able to declare independence after the rebellion of Ashina Tuizi. However, after Ilterish Khagan re-established the Turkic Khaganate in 681, competition to control the Silk Road caused tension between the Khaganate and Türgesh khaghans. At the beginning of the 8th century, the Türgesh were subjugated by the Turkic Khaganate, but this was not long lasting.

== Early Reign ==
Suluk was a Chor serving under Suoge before the Battle of Bolchu. After Suoge's defeat, the Türgesh migrated to south of Zhetysu valley. During Qapaghan Qaghan's death and Kul Tegin's coup, they used the opportunity to reassert independence and chose Suluk, a Black Türgesh chieftain to be their supreme leader in 715 or 716. However as in Suoge's case, he was not acknowledged as a Khagan by Tang. Ashina Xian was appointed "Shixing Qaghan" and Suluk was assigned as his subordinate general with titles "Great General of the Left Wing of the Forestial Army" (左羽林軍大將軍) and "Grand Military Commissioner of Jinfang" (經略大使金方) by Xuanzong. However, this ended up causing a rift between the two, as Suluk defeated Xian on June or July of 717, besieging Aksu and Uch Turfan along the way. He declared himself as khagan during August or September. Xuanzong had to accept Suluk's independence and titled him as the Duke of Shunguo (順国公) in 718 and Zhongshun Khagan (Chinese: 忠順可汗; lit. 'Loyal and Obedient Khagan') in 719.

== Struggle against Umayyads ==
With his eastern flank secured, beginning by 721, Suluk fought against the Arab armies for ten years. Backed by other local powers (including the Sogdians) against the invading Umayyads, his operations were generally hit and run operations and his maneuvers were aimed at the depriving the invading army of water. Although his army was much smaller than that of the Arabs, Suluk found success through his familiarity with the local area. Throughout the conflicts, the Arab army had to withdraw to find fresh water, such as in the Day of Thirst in 724 and the Battle of the Defile in 731. He was known by Arabs as Abū Muzāhim ("Father of the Competition").

== Later reign ==
Suluk had a conflict with Du Xian in 726. When Princess Jiaohe, one of Suluk's wives, sent messengers and 1,000 horses to Du's headquarters to sell horses, the messengers read of an order from her, which Du responded by angrily stating, "How dare an Ashina woman issue me an order?". Du had the messengers caned and the horses detained. In late 726, after Du left his office, Suluk attacked Tarim Basin, causing much damage. Suluk only withdrew from the attack when he heard that Du had been made chancellor.

On 27 October 735, Suluk attacked Beshbaliq, however his forces was crushed by Tang's armies. He was then forced to send his envoy Ulu Tarkhan (胡禄达干) to make peace.

Another defeat at Battle of Kharistan in 737 sealed Suluk's fate. He was killed in 737 or 738 by Baga Tarkhan, one of his relatives.

== Aftermath ==
The death of Suluk caused a civil war, which divided the Türgesh into two rival factions: the Yellow Türgesh, who supported Baga Tarkhan and the Black Türgesh, who supported Kut Chor.

Bilge Khagan, the last of the able Turkic khagans, was already dead and with the death of Suluk, Transoxiana was opened to Arabic conquest. Around this time there was a power shift in the Caliphate, as the Umayyad dynasty was supplanted by the Abbasid dynasty. The policy of the Abbasid Caliphs was more peaceful than that of the Umayyads and Arab control of Transoxiana was limited to the occupation of a few forts.

== Family ==
He had three wives:

- Princess Jiaohe (交河公主) - m. 722, Ashina Huaidao's daughter
- Bilge Qaghan's daughter - m. 733
- Drönmalon - m. 734, Tridu Songtsen's daughter

Issues:

- Kut Chor (738-739)
- Ton Apa Yabghu
