= Kut Chor =

- Türgesh Qaghan
- Reign: 738–739
- Predecessor: Suluk
- Successor: Kul Chor
- Father: Suluk
- Religion: Tengrism

Kut Chor (Chinese: 骨啜; pinyin: Gǔchuài; full title: Chinese: 吐火仙骨啜可汗; pinyin: Tǔhuǒxiāngǔchuài Kèhán) was a son of Suluk and briefly served as Türgesh khagan.

== Reign ==
He was set up on throne by Tumodu in Suyab, having support of the Black Turgesh and his brother Ton Apa Yabgu. His main contenders were Baga Tarkhan and Erwei Tegin (Erbey Tegin) in Taraz.

On 27 August 739, Baga Tarkhan allied with Tang general Gai Jiayun (蓋嘉運), King of Chach Baghatur Tudun (莫賀咄吐屯) and attacked Kut Chor. He was sent to Changan, where he was symbolically sacrificed before imperial temple only to be pardoned by Xuanzong and created a Tang general in Left Guard.

== Sources ==
- Old Book of Tang, vol 144
