= Zhang Yue (Tang dynasty) =

Chinese historian, military general, poet and politician

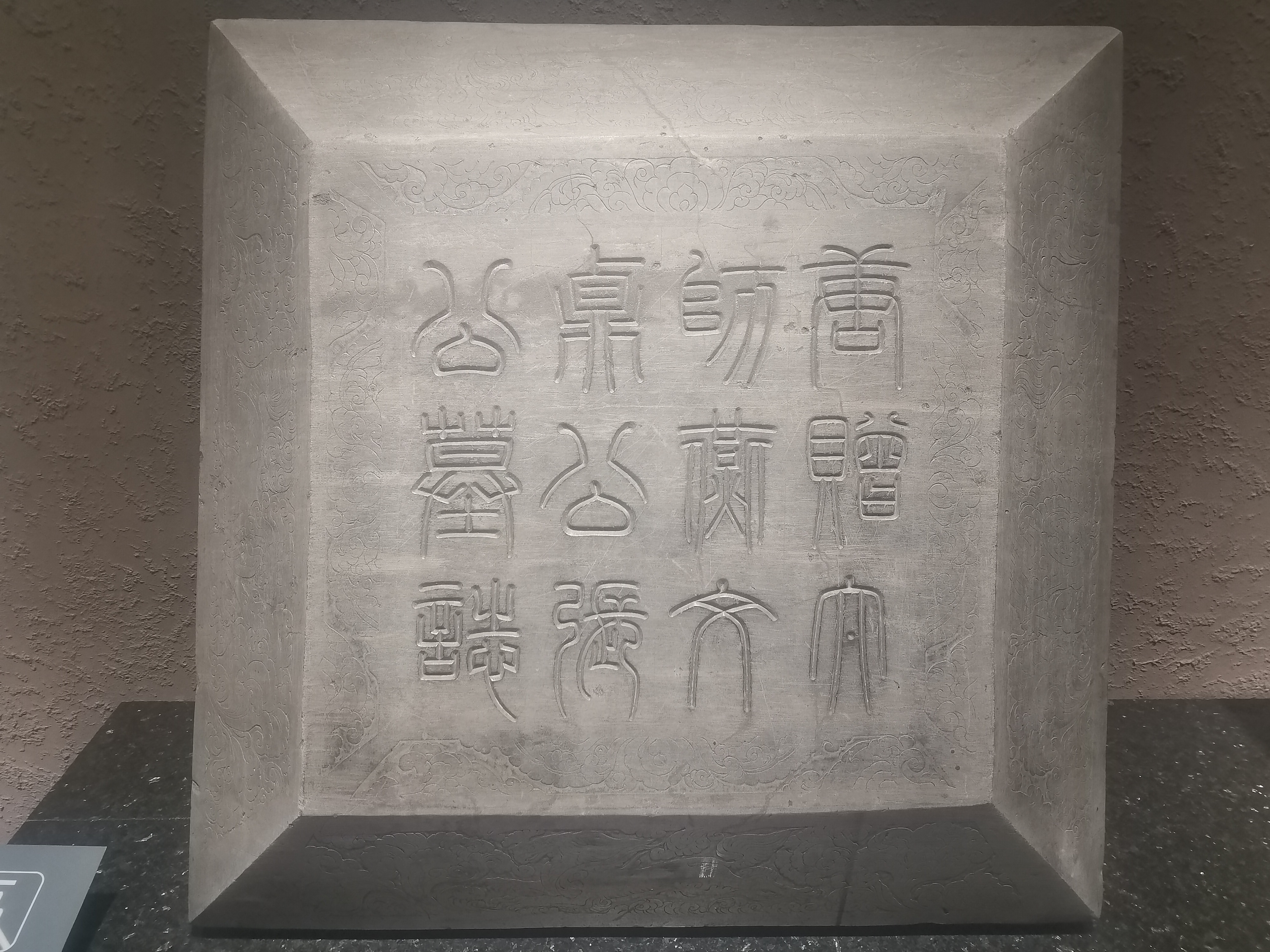
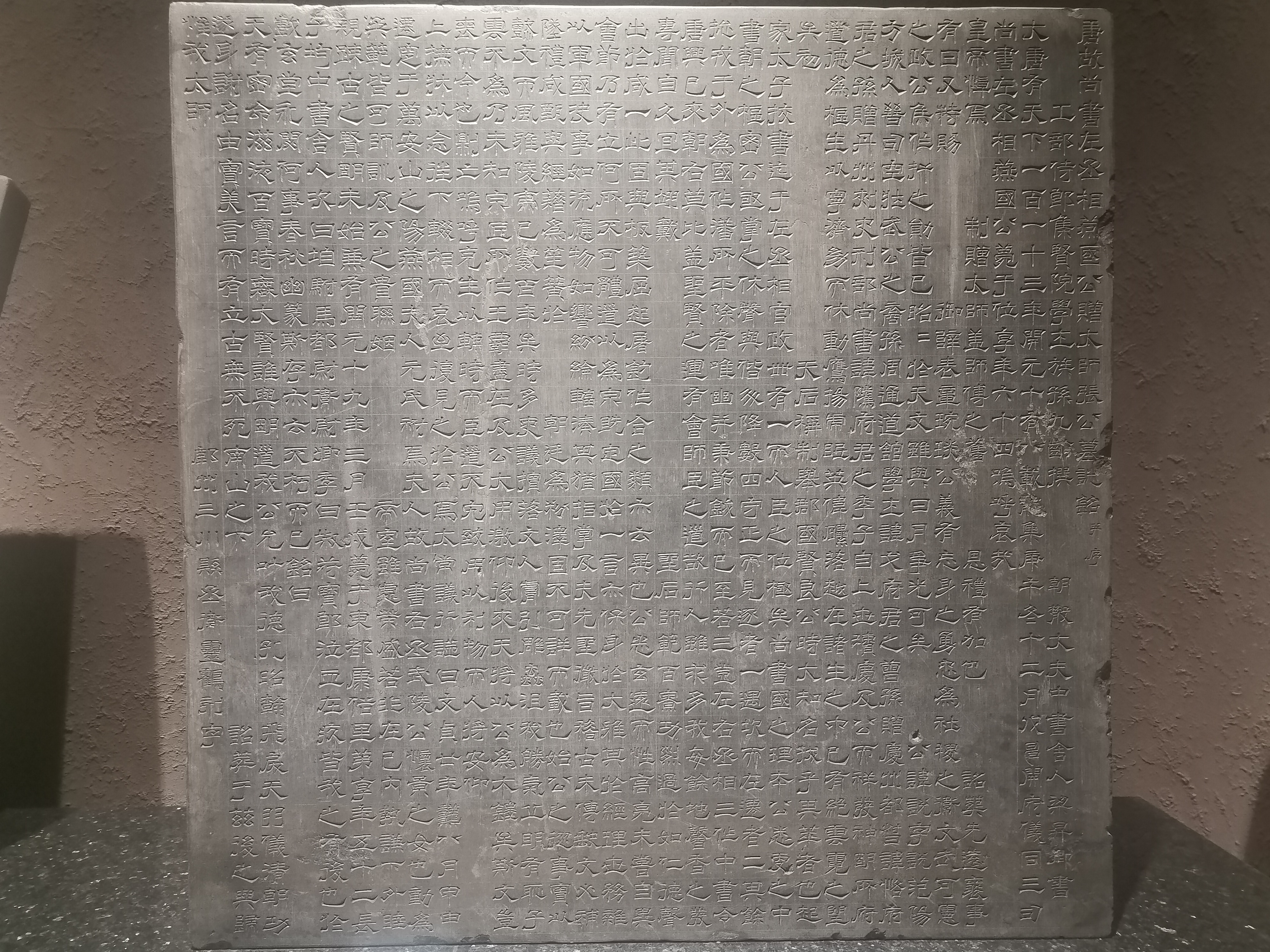
Epitaph of Zhang Yue, Luoyang Museum

Zhang Yue (simplified Chinese: 张说; traditional Chinese: 張說; pinyin: Zhāng Yuè) (667 – 9 February 731), courtesy name Daoji (道濟) or Yuezhi (說之), posthumous name Duke Wenzhen of Yan (燕文貞公), was a Chinese historian, military general, poet, and politician of the Tang and Wu Zhou dynasties. He served as chancellor on three occasions during the reigns of Emperor Ruizong and under Emperor Xuanzong. He was known for having suggested the transition of Tang central government armed forces from being conscription-based to recruitment-based, and for turning the office of the chancellor into a specialized post with strong executive powers.

Zhang Yue was a well-respected literary figure of his time, and was ranked alongside Su Ting (Duke Wenxian of Xu, another of Emperor Xuanzong's chancellors) as the two great writers of the Kaiyuan era. They were known in unison as 燕許大手筆 ("Immense pen-brushes from Yan and Xu").

== Background ==
Zhang Yue was born in 667, during the reign of Emperor Gaozong. His family was from the Tang dynasty eastern capital Luoyang, and traced its ancestry to the great Han dynasty strategist Zhang Liang, as well as a line of officials that served Cao Wei, Jin dynasty (266–420), Northern Wei, and Northern Zhou.

In his youth, Zhang Yue passed the imperial examinations and received the highest score among the group of people who took the exam at the same time. He was made an attendant in the crown prince's studies.

== During Wu Zetian's reign ==
During the reign of Wu Zetian (r. 690–705), Zhang Yue was gradually promoted to You Bujue (右補闕), a low-level official at the legislative bureau of government (鳳閣, Fengge). While serving there, he participated in a project, headed by Li Jiao to create a work known as the Essence of Pearls from the Three Religions (三教珠英, Sanjiao Zhuying)—a compilation of various poetry about Confucianism, Buddhism, and Taoism, in which Wu Zetian's lovers Zhang Yizhi and Zhang Changzong also participated, to give them a legitimate reason to enter the palace. In 700, when Wu Zetian spent summer and fall at Sanyang Palace (三陽宮), away from Luoyang (which she had made capital), Zhang Yue submitted an earnest petition urging her to return to Luoyang, which she did not accept. Early in her Chang'an era (701-705), the Essence of Pearls from the Three Religions was completed, and the participants were rewarded—with Zhang Yue becoming You Shi (右史), an imperial chronicler, as well as an imperial attendant; he was also put in charge of grading the entries of imperial examination takers. Sometime thereafter, he was promoted to be Fengge Sheren (鳳閣舍人), a mid-level official at the legislative bureau.

In 703, Zhang Yizhi and Zhang Changzong were apprehensive that if Wu Zetian, who was ill at the time, died, they would be killed by the senior chancellor Wei Yuanzhong. They therefore falsely accused Wei and the official Gao Jian (高戩) of having said that Wu Zetian was too old and that it was better to support her son and crown prince, Li Xian. Wu Zetian, in anger, arrested Wei and Gao, who proclaimed their innocence. Zhang Changzong promised Zhang Yue a promotion if he would corroborate the accusations against Wei, who was Zhang Yue's superior. Zhang Yue initially agreed, but as he entered the palace, several fellow junior officials, Song Jing, Zhang Tinggui (張廷珪), and Liu Zhiji, pointed out to him that it was important for him to leave a clean name in history. After he entered Wu Zetian's presence, instead of corroborating Zhang Yizhi and Zhang Changzong's accusations against Wei, he proclaimed Wei's innocence and accused Zhang Changzong of suborning perjury. Wu Zetian, while angry at Zhang Yue, spared Wei and Gao as a result, exiling them and Zhang Yue instead to the Lingnan region—in Zhang Yue's case, to Qin Prefecture (欽州, roughly modern Qinzhou, Guangdong). Zhang Yue would remain there for the rest of Wu Zetian's reign.

== During Emperor Zhongzong's second reign ==
In 705, Wu Zetian was overthrown, and Li Xian, a former emperor, returned to the throne (as Emperor Zhongzong). He recalled Zhang Yue from exile to serve as an official at the ministry of defense (兵部, Bingbu). Subsequently, Zhang was made the deputy minister of public works (工部侍郎, Gongbu Shilang). During Emperor Zhongzong's Jinglong era (707-710), his mother died, and he left public service to observe a period of mourning—traditionally three years under Confucian principles, but which were often shortened for officials. After he had mourned for the typical shortened period, Emperor Zhongzong was set to recall him to serve as Huangmen Shilang (黃門侍郎), the deputy head of the examination bureau (門下省, Menxia Sheng), but he declined, asking to mourn for the entire three-year period. He was allowed to do so, and this drew popular approval. After the three-year period was complete, he was recalled to serve again as the deputy minister of public works, and then the deputy minister of defense (兵部侍郎, Bingbu Shilang). He was also made an imperial scholar at Hongwen Pavilion (弘文館). Sometime during Emperor Zhongzong's reign, Zhang submitted a petition asking him to end his habit, which started in Wu Zetian's reign, of going up a tower to watch non-Han splash cold water on themselves to celebrate the arrival of winter, on account that such a ceremony was disrespectful. Emperor Zhongzong agreed, and stopped watching such ceremonies.

== During Emperor Ruizong's second reign ==
In 710, Emperor Zhongzong died suddenly—a death that traditional historians believed to be a poisoning carried out by his powerful wife Empress Wei and daughter Li Guo'er the Princess Anle, so that Empress Wei could be "emperor" like Wu Zetian and Li Guo'er could be crown princess. Meanwhile, Emperor Zhongzong's son by a concubine, Li Chongmao the Prince of Wen, was named emperor (as Emperor Shang), but Empress Wei retained power as empress dowager and regent. Less than a month later, Emperor Zhongzong's sister Princess Taiping and nephew Li Longji the Prince of Linzi rose in rebellion, killing Empress Dowager Wei and Li Guo'er. Li Longji's father Li Dan the Prince of Xiang, himself a former emperor, returned to the throne (as Emperor Ruizong), displacing Emperor Shang. After Emperor Ruizong's return to the throne, Zhang Yue was made Zhongshu Shilang (中書侍郎), the deputy head of the legislative bureau (by now named Zhongshu Sheng (中書省)), as well as the secretary general for the capital prefecture Yong Prefecture (雍州, roughly modern Xi'an, Shaanxi, as Emperor Zhongzong moved the capital back to Chang'an from Luoyang). Later that year, Emperor Zhongzong's son Li Chongfu the Prince of Qiao tried to rise against Emperor Ruizong at Luoyang, but was quickly defeated, and he committed suicide. Several hundred of people, accused of being complicit with Li Chongfu's plot, were arrested, but it was difficult to adjudicate their guilt or innocence. Emperor Ruizong sent Zhang to Luoyang to judge them. Zhang, after interrogating Li Chongfu's main co-conspirators Zhang Lingjun (張靈均) and Zheng Yin, quickly figured out that most of the accused were not part of the plot, and released them. Once he returned to Chang'an, Emperor Ruizong thanked him:

I know that, as you, Lord, judged this case, that the good were not falsely convicted, and the guilty were not released. How would this be possible except for your faithfulness and righteousness?

At that time, Li Longji was crown prince, and both Zhang Yue and Chu Wuliang (褚無量) served as attending officials in his studies, and he became close to them.

In 711, Zhang was given the designation Tong Zhongshu Menxia Pingzhangshi (同中書門下平章事), making him a chancellor de facto. At that time, there was much struggle at court between the factions of Princess Taiping and Li Longji. At one point, there was a prediction by a sorcerer that there would be an incursion into a palace—a prediction that much troubled Emperor Ruizong. Zhang stated that this rumor must have been spread by someone who was intent to harm Li Longji, and that the best way to dissipate the rumors would be for Emperor Ruizong to transfer some of the authority to Li Longji—an assessment that fellow chancellor Yao Chong concurred in. Emperor Ruizong agreed and did so. (However, when Yao and Song Jing then proposed sending Princess Taiping and two princes with arguably better claims on the crown prince title than Li Longji—his older brother Li Chengqi the Prince of Song and cousin Li Shouli the Prince of Bin (the son of Emperor Zhongzong's and Ruizong's older brother Li Xian (note different character than Emperor Zhongzong)) -- out of the capital, Princess Taiping found out and got Yao and Song demoted out of the capital, although Zhang was not demoted at that time. Later that year, however, as a part of a government reorganization, Zhang, along with the other chancellors, were removed from their chancellor positions. Zhang was made Shangshu Zuo Cheng (尚書左丞), one of the Secretaries General of the executive bureau (尚書省, Shangshu Sheng), and given an office in Luoyang, away from Chang'an.

== During Emperor Xuanzong's reign ==
In 712, Emperor Ruizong passed the throne to Li Longji, who took the throne as Emperor Xuanzong. However, Emperor Ruizong retained most of the imperial authority as Taishang Huang (retired emperor). Princess Taiping, who was of high noble status and her wealth, which included: treasure, slaves, livestock, and real estate, was more than the imperial house, and through retired emperor, continued to exert excessive influence on governance. As of 713, it was said that five of the seven chancellors at the time -- Dou Huaizhen, Cen Xi, Xiao Zhizhong, Cui Shi, and Lu Xiangxian, and three of the four generals of the Forbidden Troops at the time—Chang Yuankai, Li Ci, and Li Qin—were recommended by her (although Lu was not considered a follower of hers). Also, the majority of officials and officers depended on her, and her spies were scattered everywhere. So she was in power and was secretly and openly at war with Emperor Xuanzong. With Emperor Xuanzong and Princess Taiping locked into a power struggle, Zhang Yue, from his post at Luoyang, had a messenger present Emperor Xuanzong with his sword—meaning to tell him that it was time to take decisive action. Meanwhile, it was said that Princess Taiping, Dou, Cen, Xiao, and Cui; along with other officials Xue Ji, Li Jin (李晉) the Prince of Xinxing (a grandson of Li Deliang (李德良), a cousin of Tang's founder Emperor Gaozu), Li You (李猷), Jia Yingfu (賈膺福), Tang Jun (唐晙); the generals Chang Yuankai (常元楷), Li Ci (李慈), and Li Qin (李欽); and the monk Huifan (惠範), were plotting to overthrow Emperor Xuanzong. It was further said that they discussed, with the lady in waiting Lady Yuan to poison the gastrodia elata that Emperor Xuanzong routinely took as an aphrodisiac. When this alleged plot was reported to Emperor Xuanzong by Wei Zhigu, Emperor Xuanzong, who had already received advice from Wang Ju (王琚) and Cui Riyong, in addition to Zhang, to act first, did so. He convened a meeting with his brothers Li Fan (李範) the Prince of Qi, Li Ye (李業) the Prince of Xue, Guo, along with a number of his associates — the general Wang Maozhong (王毛仲), the officials Jiang Jiao (姜皎) and Li Lingwen (李令問), his brother-in-law Wang Shouyi (王守一), the eunuch Gao Lishi, and the military officer Li Shoude (李守德) — and decided to act first. On July 29, Emperor Xuanzong had Wang Maozhong take 300 soldiers to the imperial guard camp to behead Chang and Li Ci. Then, Jia, Li You, Xiao, and Cen were arrested and executed as well. Dou and Princess Taiping committed suicide. Emperor Ruizong turned over imperial authority to Emperor Xuanzong and thereafter was no longer involved in important decisions. Emperor Xuanzong subsequently recalled Zhang from Luoyang to serve as Zhongshu Ling (中書令), the head of the legislative bureau and a post considered one for a chancellor. Later in the year, when Emperor Xuanzong changed the names of many official titles, the legislative bureau's name was changed to Ziwei Sheng (紫微省), and its head's title changed to Ziwei Ling (紫微令); Zhang's title changed accordingly. When it was discovered that the former chancellor Li Jiao, during Empress Dowager Wei's regency, had suggested that Emperor Ruizong's sons be sent out of Chang'an to serve as local officials, there was suggestions that Li Jiao should be executed, but Zhang pointed out that while Li Jiao might be viewed as having suggested inappropriate, he was being faithful to Empress Dowager Wei. Emperor Xuanzong agreed, and only sent Li Jiao's son Li Chang (李暢) out of Chang'an to serve as a prefectural prefect, and had Li Jiao go with his son.

Emperor Xuanzong, meanwhile, was prepared to recall Yao Chong to serve as chancellor as well. It was said that Zhang disliked Yao, and tried to prevent Yao's promotion by having the chief imperial censor Zhao Yanzhao file an indictment against Yao, and then had Emperor Xuanzong's associate Jiang Jiao (姜皎) recommend Yao to serve as the commandant at Bing Prefecture (并州, roughly modern Taiyuan, Shanxi) -- both of which Emperor Xuanzong rebuffed, and Emperor Xuanzong recalled Yao to serve as minister of defense and chancellor de facto. Yao, later in the year, accused Zhang of meeting Emperor Xuanzong's brother Li Fan secretly. Around the new year 713, Emperor Xuanzong demoted Zhang to serve as the prefect of Xiang Prefecture (相州, in modern Handan, Hebei), and as the examiner of the Hebei Circuit (河北道, roughly modern Hebei, Beijing, and Tianjin). For reasons lost to history, he was later demoted to be the prefect of Yue Prefecture (岳州, roughly modern Yueyang, Hunan), and the benefits he was to draw from his fief were suspended. Zhang became fearful of what would come next. At that time, one of the chancellors was Su Ting, whose father Su Gui Zhang had been a friend of. Zhang thus wrote a poem praising five great officials, including Su Gui, and presented it to Su Ting. Su Ting was greatly touched by the poem, and submitted a petition to Emperor Xuanzong pointing out of Zhang's great contributions. Thereafter, Zhang was made the secretary general of the more important Jing Prefecture (荊州, roughly modern Jingzhou, Hubei). He was later further given a general title and made the acting commandant at You Prefecture (幽州, roughly modern Beijing). On one occasion when he went to Chang'an to meet Emperor Xuanzong, he did so in military uniform, impressing Emperor Xuanzong with his preparedness. Emperor Xuanzong then made him the acting secretary general at Bing Prefecture; the commander of the Tianbing Base (天兵軍, in Bing Prefecture); and chief imperial censor, with directions that he be responsible for editing imperial histories, despite his departure from Chang'an—that is, to have the historical archives delivered to him so that he can edit them while in the army.

In 720, Wang Jun, the commander of the army at Shuofang (朔方, in modern Yinchuan, Ningxia), accused the Pugu (僕固) and Jiadie (name not in Unicode) tribal chieftains of plotting to betray Tang territory to Eastern Tujue, and slaughtered them. When this was heard by people of Bayegu (拔曵固) and Tongluo (同羅) tribes, who were settled in Zhang's territory, became terrified. Zhang, taking only 20 cavalry soldiers with him, toured the tribal areas to comfort them, spending nights with them in the tents. Zhang's deputy Li Xian (李憲, note different character than Emperor Zhongzong and the former crown prince) believed that it was not wise to trust the tribes in this manner and sent a letter to Zhang trying to dissuade him. Zhang responded famously:

Although I am not a yellow goat, I am not afraid to have my flesh eaten. Although I am not a wild horse, I am not afraid to have my blood shed. An official has his responsibilities in dangerous times. This is time for me to risk death.

As a result of Zhang's tour, the Bayegu and Tongluo tribes were calmed and did not create any problems. Subsequently, in 721, when Kang Daibin (康待賓) rose in rebellion in the Shuofang region, Emperor Xuanzong commissioned Zhang, along with Wang Jun and Wang Maozhong, to attack Kang. Wang Jun was soon able to capture Kang and deliver him to Emperor Xuanzong. Meanwhile, Zhang's subordinate, the general Ashina Xian (阿史那獻), suggested that the Dangxiang tribes, which did not rebel with Kang but was in contact with Kang's forces, be slaughtered, but Zhang refused, pointing out that Kang had already been defeated and that the killing should not be excessive. Later that year, Zhang was recalled to Chang'an to serve as minister of defense (兵部尚書, Bingbu Shangshu) and chancellor de facto with the designation Tong Zhongshu Menxia Sanpin (同中書門下三品), and he continued to be responsible for editing the imperial histories.

In 722, Zhang was also given the title as military governor (with the recently created title of jiedushi) of Shuofang base, and he toured Shuofang. When Kang Daibin's former associate Kang Yuanzi (康願子) rebelled and claimed khan title, Zhang captured him and moved his people to the modern Henan region. Meanwhile, at Zhang's suggestion, the Tang northern border defense forces, which had about 600,000 men at that time, was reduced by 200,000 men to allow the soldiers to return home. Further, seeing that the Tang conscription system, due to abuses against the soldiers at the time, was near a collapse, as the soldiers were forced into long tours of duty but their families were not exempt from taxes, thus causing great numbers of desertions, Zhang suggested a switch to a recruitment-based system where soldiers were paid salaries. This allowed, for a time, Tang's soldier supply to be replenished. (Some later historians condemned Zhang for the abolition of the conscription system, believing the abolition to be the root of Tang's later fracturing, but some others, such as the modern historian Bo Yang, argued that Zhang's actions not only were necessary to restore the supply of soldiers but saved many lives.) Soon thereafter, Pei Zhouxian (裴伷先) the commandant at Guang Prefecture (廣州, roughly modern Guangzhou, Guangdong) was accused of corruption, and the chancellor Zhang Jiazhen advocated caning him. However, Zhang Yue argued that public caning is inappropriate for high-level officials, and Emperor Xuanzong agreed. After the meeting with Emperor Xuanzong was over, Zhang Jiazhen, displeased, asked Zhang Yue, "Why did you have to go into such deep talk?" Zhang Yue responded:

Chancellors come and go. If even high-level officials can be caned, then perhaps one day we will be caned as well. I did not speak those words just for Pei Zhouxian, but for all learned people of the realm.

As of 723, Zhang Yue and Zhang Jiazhen were not on good terms. When Zhang Jiazhen's brother Zhang Jiayou (張嘉祐) was accused of corruption, Zhang Yue suggested to Zhang Jiazhen that he wear plain clothes and wait for punishment outside the palace, and Zhang Jiazhen agreed. Zhang Jiazhen was subsequently demoted to be the prefect of You Prefecture. Later that year, Zhang Yue was again made Zhongshu Ling. Meanwhile, Emperor Xuanzong, an ardent student of literature, had commissioned the creation of a literary institute known as Lizheng Institute (麗正書院, later renamed Jixian Institute (集賢院)), headed by Zhang Yue, for literary studies, with such officials as Xu Jian (徐堅), He Zhizhang (賀知章), and Zhao Dongxi (趙冬曦) serving as scholars, to accompany him in his literary studies. The official Lu Jian (陸堅), believing that the expenses for maintaining Lizheng Institute were unjustified, planned to petition to disband it. Zhang Yue pointed out that the study of literature had relatively low expenses and had great cultural value to dissuade Lu from submitting the petition, and when Emperor Xuanzong heard this, he had even greater respect for Zhang. Around the same time, Zhang also proposed a reorganization of the office of the chancellors—renaming it from Zhengshi Tang (政事堂) to Zhongshu Menxia (中書門下), and further creating five subordinate offices therein to be responsible for five separate areas of governance.

In 724, at Zhang's suggestion, Emperor Xuanzong began to prepare a grand ceremony (known as Fengshan (封禪)) to offer sacrifices to heaven and earth at Mount Tai—despite opposition from fellow chancellor Yuan Qianyao, which began discord between Zhang and Yuan. Emperor Xuanzong carried out the ceremony at 725—and the ceremony caused much resentment toward Zhang, as, at Zhang's recommendations, a number of officials at the legislative and examination bureaus participated in the ceremony and were promoted after the ceremony, but other officials were not awarded, and neither were the soldiers who attended to Emperor Xuanzong during the ceremony. Zhang himself was given the additional title of You Chengxiang (右丞相), one of the heads of the executive bureau.

In 726, at Zhang's suggestion, regulations on ceremonies, which had twice been codified during the reigns of Emperor Taizong and Emperor Gaozong, were reorganized to harmonize the different regulations written during those reigns.

Later in the year, though, Zhang's hold on power would crumble. Emperor Xuanzong had recalled Cui Yinfu (崔隱甫) the mayor of Luoyang to Chang'an, planning to promote him. Zhang, who viewed Cui lightly because Cui's lack of literary talent, suggested that Cui be made a general. Meanwhile, Zhang had recommended another official, Cui Rizhi (崔日知, Cui Riyong's cousin), to be chief imperial censor. Emperor Xuanzong rejected both recommendations, and made Cui Rizhi a general and Cui Yinfu the chief imperial censor. Cui Yinfu, knowing that Zhang had opposed his promotion, subsequently submitted an indictment for corruption against Zhang, along with fellow censors Yuwen Rong, whom Zhang also disliked, and Li Linfu. Emperor Xuanzong had Yuan, Cui Yinfu, Wei Kang (韋抗) the minister of justice, and Hu Gui (胡珪) the assistant chief judge of the supreme court, interrogate Zhang. Evidence of Zhang's corruption were found. However, when Emperor Xuanzong sent Gao Lishi to visit Zhang, Gao reported back that Zhang had shown great humility—by sleeping on a straw mat and eating with clay pots—in his distress, and Gao further pointed out to Emperor Xuanzong of Zhang's contributions. Emperor Xuanzong, in response, removed Zhang from his chancellor post but allowed him to remain as head of the executive bureau and head of Jixian Institute. Subsequently, Cui Yinfu and Yuwen, fearful that Zhang would again become chancellor, continued to accuse him of offenses, while Zhang's allies made counteraccusations against Cui and Yuwen. Emperor Xuanzong, tired of these accusations, in 727, ordered Zhang to retire, Cui to be removed from his post to return home to support his mother, and Yuwen to be demoted to be the prefect of Wei Prefecture (魏州, also in modern Handan).

As Zhang lost power those in his circle lost status, like Zhang Jiuling who was demoted from his position as zhongshu sheren (中書舍人, a third-level position in the Secretariat) and hanlin gongfeng (翰林供奉) where his responsibilities had included consulting for drafts of imperial decrees and letters.

In 728, Emperor Xuanzong again made Zhang a scholar at Jixian Institute. Even though Zhang was largely retired by this point, it was said that Emperor Xuanzong often sent eunuchs to ask for his suggestions when important matters were to be decided.

In 729, Zhang was made Zuo Chengxiang (左丞相), the other head of the executive bureau. The day that Zhang was to take office, Song and Yuan were to be take new offices as well, Emperor Xuanzong set up a grand ceremony for their inauguration, including an elaborate tent, music, and food from the imperial kitchen. Emperor Xuanzong personally wrote a poem commemorating the contributions of the three. He also gave Zhang the honorific title Kaifu Yitong Sansi (開府儀同三司). By this time, Zhang Yue's oldest son Zhang Jun (張均) was serving as a mid-level official at the legislative bureau, and the second son Zhang Ji (張垍) had been given Emperor Xuanzong's daughter Princess Ningqing in marriage. Zhang Yue's brother Zhang Guang (張光) carried the honorific title Yinqing Guanglu Daifu (銀青光祿大夫). It was said that there was no official whose household was more honored than Zhang Yue's.

In 730, Zhang Yue fell ill, and he died in February 731. Emperor Xuanzong had him buried with great honors.

== See also ==
- Zhuying ji
