= Wang Jun (Tang chancellor) =

Chinese military general and politician

Wang Jun (王晙) (died 732), formally Duke Zhonglie of Zhongshan (中山忠烈公), was a Chinese military general and politician during the Tang dynasty and Wu Zetian's Zhou dynasty, largely known for his service as a general during the reign of Emperor Xuanzong, when he also briefly served as chancellor.

== Background ==
It is not known which year Wang Jun was born, although the timeframe suggests that he was born in the reign of Emperor Gaozong. His family was from Cang Prefecture (滄州, roughly modern Cangzhou, Hebei), and traced itself to the Northern Wei official Wang Rui (王叡), whose descendants served as officials for the Northern Wei, Sui, and Tang. Wang Jun's grandfather Wang Youfang (王有方) served as a prefectural prefect, and Wang Jun's father Wang Xingguo (王行果) was a well-known sheriff of the capital county Chang'an County. Wang Xingguo died when Wang Jun was still young, and Wang Jun, despite his father's death, was studious. Wang Youfang was impressed and stated, "This child will glorify this household." After he grew up, he was known for openness in his character and dislike for details. He passed the imperial examinations in his youth and thereafter served as the sheriff of Qingwan County (清苑, in modern Baoding, Hebei).

== During Wu Zetian's reign ==
As of the reign of Emperor Gaozong's wife Wu Zetian (r. 690–705), Wang Jun served as Dianzhong Shi Yushi (殿中侍御史), a low-level imperial censor and also carried the honorific title of Chaosan Daifu (朝散大夫). On an occasion when the chancellor Wei Yuanzhong was commissioned to defend against an Eastern Tujue incursion, Wei was unable to defeat Eastern Tujue forces and blamed the lack of success on his deputy Han Sizhong (韓思忠), requesting that Han be executed. Wang, before Wu Zetian, argued that Wei, as the commander, should not divert all of the responsibility on his deputy. He also pointed out that Han was not in command and was brave and intelligent. Han was able to escape death, but as a result, Wang was sent out of the capital to serve as the magistrate of Weinan County (渭南, in modern Weinan, Shaanxi). When Wei was falsely accused by Wu Zetian's lovers Zhang Yizhi and Zhang Changzong of plotting treason in 703, however, Wang submitted a petition arguing that Wei was innocent, impressing his former colleague Song Jing for his fortitude.

== During Emperor Zhongzong's second reign, Emperor Shang's reign, and Emperor Ruizong's second reign ==
Near the end of the Jinglong era (707-710) of Wu Zetian's son and successor Emperor Zhongzong, Wang Jun became the commandant at Gui Prefecture (桂州, roughly modern Guilin, Guangxi). Prior to Wang's term of service, the soldiers stationed at Gui Prefecture often depended on food supplies from Heng (modern Hengyang, Hunan) and Yong (永州, roughly modern Yongzhou, Hunan) Prefectures. Wang built forts and levees and encouraged farming, ending the need for food supply shipments. At one point, he requested to leave his office and return home, and the people of the prefecture petitioned the emperor (probably Emperor Zhongzong's brother Emperor Ruizong, who displaced Emperor Zhongzong's son Emperor Shang in 710 after Emperor Zhongzong's death) to keep him at Gui Prefecture, and the emperor agreed.

== During Emperor Xuanzong's reign ==
In 712, Emperor Ruizong passed the throne to his son Li Longji the Crown Prince, and Li Longji took the throne as Emperor Xuanzong. However, Emperor Ruizong continued to exercise most of the imperial powers as Taishang Huang (retired emperor), and his sister Princess Taiping continued to have great influence on the administration, causing the court to effectively divide into Princess Taiping's faction and Emperor Xuanzong's faction. At that time, the faction was more effective and stronger than Princess Taiping. Alongside this faction, Princess Taiping experience and achievements were greater than those of Emperor Xuanzong, so she had a more effective say, and Emperor Ruizong himself was more at her side. All of this made things very difficult for Emperor Xuanzong, forcing him to stay a little further back to avoid giving excuses to his aunt. Later in 712, Emperor Xuanzong's associates, the chancellor Liu Youqiu and the general Zhang Wei (張暐), believing that Princess Taiping's faction was going to act against Emperor Xuanzong, planned to kill key members of her faction, but the news leaked. Emperor Ruizong exiled Liu and Zhang—in Liu's case, to Feng Prefecture (封州, roughly modern Zhaoqing, Guangdong). Princess Taiping's associate, the chancellor Cui Shi, subsequently gave instructions to Zhou Lizhen (周利貞) the commandant at Guang Prefecture (廣州, roughly modern Guangzhou, Guangdong), under whose area of responsibility Feng Prefecture was, to have Liu killed. Wang Jun, who was a friend of Liu's heard of this secret instruction, and therefore, when Liu went through Gui Prefecture, detained him and refused to let him go on to Feng Prefecture. Zhou submitted accusations that Wang was disobeying an imperial edict, and Cui repeatedly tried to pressure Wang to release Liu to Feng Prefecture. Liu himself pointed out to Wang that he did not want to put Wang in danger as well, but Wang refused to let Liu go on, and Liu was spared from death. After Emperor Xuanzong suppressed Princess Taiping's faction in 713, he recalled Liu to again serve as chancellor. Soon thereafter, Wang was recalled and made the deputy commander of the armies in the Shuofang region, in actual command. Sometime thereafter, he was made the deputy minister of husbandry (太僕少卿, Taipu Shaoqing), responsible for the herds of the Longyou (隴右, eastern Gansu) region.

In 714, there was a major incursion by the Tibetan Empire's forces under 'Bod da rgyas (Chinese: 坌達延). Wang led the 2,000 troops under his command to resist. He put 700 of his soldiers in Tibetan uniform and made a surprise attack, causing much panic in the Tibetan army. Subsequently, when troops under the command of the general Xue Ne arrived, he counterattacked along with Xue, dealing Tibetan forces a serious defeat. Wang was made the Baron of Qingyuan and given the honorific title Yinqing Guanglu Daifu (銀青光祿大夫). He was also made the commandant at Yuan Prefecture (原州, roughly modern Guyuan, Ningxia), and his son Wang Ting (王珽) was given the honorific title of Chaosan Daifu. He was soon made the secretary general at Bing Prefecture (并州, roughly modern Taiyuan, Shanxi).

In 716, Qapaghan Qaghan of the Göktürks was killed in battle, and in the confusion that ensued, a large group of Göktürks surrendered to Tang. Soon, however, his nephew Bilge Khagan settled down the situation. Wang, believing that the Göktürks who surrendered would try to flee back to the Göktürk state, suggested that they be forcibly moved into the heart of the empire to prevent them from doing so. Before Wang's suggestion could be acted upon, however, there was an uprising by the Göktürks who surrendered, under the leadership of Xiedie Sitai (𨁂跌思泰) and Axilan (阿悉爛). Xue and Wang tried to intercept them and dealt them defeats, but they were able to flee back to the Göktürk state anyway.

In 720, Wang believed that the Pugu (僕固) and Xiedie tribes of the region were planning to defect to Eastern Tujue and attack with Eastern Tujue troops. He thus held a feast and invited the chieftains, and, at the feast, massacred them. He then attacked the Pugu and Xiedie tribes in the area, nearly wiping them out. He then proposed a plan to attack Ashina Mojilian along with the Baximi, Xi, and Khitan. The plan was not approved, and when the Baximi launched the attack by itself, they were crushed by Eastern Tujue forces.

In 721, the non-Han Chinese in the region rebelled under the leadership of Kang Daibin (康待賓) and attacked Xia Prefecture (夏州, roughly modern Yulin, Shaanxi). Emperor Xuanzong ordered Wang and Guo Zhiyun (郭知運), the military governor (jiedushi) of Longyou Circuit to attack Kang. Wang quickly defeated and captured Kang, who was sent to Chang'an and executed there. He accepted many tribes' surrender. He was created the Duke of Qingyuan. However, when Guo arrived, Guo attacked those tribes, which thus believed that Wang was treacherous to them and rebelled again. Emperor Xuanzong blamed this on Wang and demoted him to be the prefect of Zi Prefecture (梓州, roughly modern Mianyang, Sichuan).

In 722, Emperor Xuanzong recalled Wang to serve on as the head of the household for his crown prince Li Siqian, and created him the Duke of Zhongshan. Subsequently, when Emperor Xuanzong went on a tour of the northern regions, he made Wang Jun the mayor of Taiyuan Municipality (converted from Bing Prefecture).

In summer 723, Wang was made the minister of defense (兵部尚書, Bingbu Shangshu) and given the designation Tong Zhongshu Menxia Sanpin (同中書門下三品), making him a chancellor de facto. He was subsequently also made the military governor of Shuofang and took a tour of the northern regions. In winter of that year, Emperor Xuanzong was set to offer sacrifices to heaven and earth, and he ordered Wang to return to the capital to attend. Wang, believing that with the water of the Yellow River freezing at the time that it would be a good time for an Eastern Tujue attack, declined, believing that he needed to defend against such an attack. Emperor Xuanzong initially approved of this and sent him a robe as an award. However, at that time, the servants of Wang Qiao (王喬) the prefect of Xu Prefecture (許州, roughly modern Xuchang, Henan) accused Wang Qiao and Wang Jun of plotting treason together. Emperor Xuanzong had Wang Jun's fellow chancellors Yuan Qianyao and Zhang Shuo investigate, but found no evidence against Wang Jun. Still, Wang Jun was demoted to be the prefect of Qi Prefecture (蘄州, roughly modern Huanggang, Hubei) on the charge of disobeying the imperial edict.

In 726, Wang Jun was again made the military governor of Shuofang. He died in 732 and was buried with honor. After his death, there was a campaign in which Emperor Xuanzong's second cousin Li Hui (李禕) the Prince of Xin'an defeated Xi forces, and purportedly, Li Hui's soldiers saw the spirits of Wang and another general, Gao Zhao (高昭), attacking the Xi with them. The official Yang Bocheng (陽伯城) proposed that Wang and Gao be posthumously honored and their tombs be enlarged. Emperor Xuanzong agreed, and further granted offices to Wang's sons.

== Notes and references ==
- Old Book of Tang, vol. 93
- New Book of Tang, vol. 111.
- Zizhi Tongjian, vols. 207, 210, 211, 212.
