= Üç Elig Khagan =

Üç Elig 乌質勒 Wuzhile
- Turgesh Qaghan
- Reign: 699–706
- Predecessor: Ashina Huseluo (as Western Turkic Qaghan)
- Successor: Suoge
- Died: 706; Suyab
- Issue: Suoge (娑葛); Zhenu (遮努)

Üç Elig (Chinese: 乌質勒, Pinyin: Wuzhile (Reconstructed as *Üç Elig in Old Turkic or *Oçırlıq, ultimately from Pali Vajira) was the first Turgesh Qaghan, from the Sary (Yellow) Türgesh faction.

== Early life ==
He was titled Bagha Tarkhan (莫贺达干) during reign of Ashina Huseluo and unlike him was kind to his subjects. He took advantage of Ashina Tuizi rebellion to assert independence. He captured regional capital Suyab in 699 and became a major force in the area. Afterwards, Huseluo did not dare to turn back from Changan. Bagha had 20 generals with each commanding 7000 soldiers.

== Reign ==
After his expulsion of Western Turkic forces, he consolidated his rule around Suyab, while designating valley of Ili River as his second residence. He sent his son Zhenu (遮努) as an envoy on 12 August 699 to court of Wu Zetian, Changan. He was created Prince of Huaide (郡王懷德) in 706.

== Death ==
Later that year, Guo Yuanzhen - the new Protectorate General to Pacify the West - arrived at Turgesh tribe to meet with Bagha Tarkhan to discuss military matters. They met outside Wuzhile's tent, and It was cold and snowing at the time, but Guo did not move. Bagha, however, was old and could not stand the cold. He was created Prince of Xihe (郡王西河), however, he died in 706 before the envoy arrived. Bagha's son Suoge (娑葛), believing that Guo's acts were deliberate, gathered his troops and got ready to attack Guo. Guo's deputy Jie Wan (解琬) became aware of this and suggested that they flee. Guo declined—stating that he felt that he needed to show sincerity, and that given that they were deep in Tuqishi territory, they could not get away anyway. The next day, he went to mourn Bagha, and showed sincere emotions in doing so. Suoge was touched and made peace with him.

== Religion ==
According to Yuri Zuev, he was a manichaeist.
