= Conquest of the Western Turks =

- Part of the Tang campaigns against the Western Turks
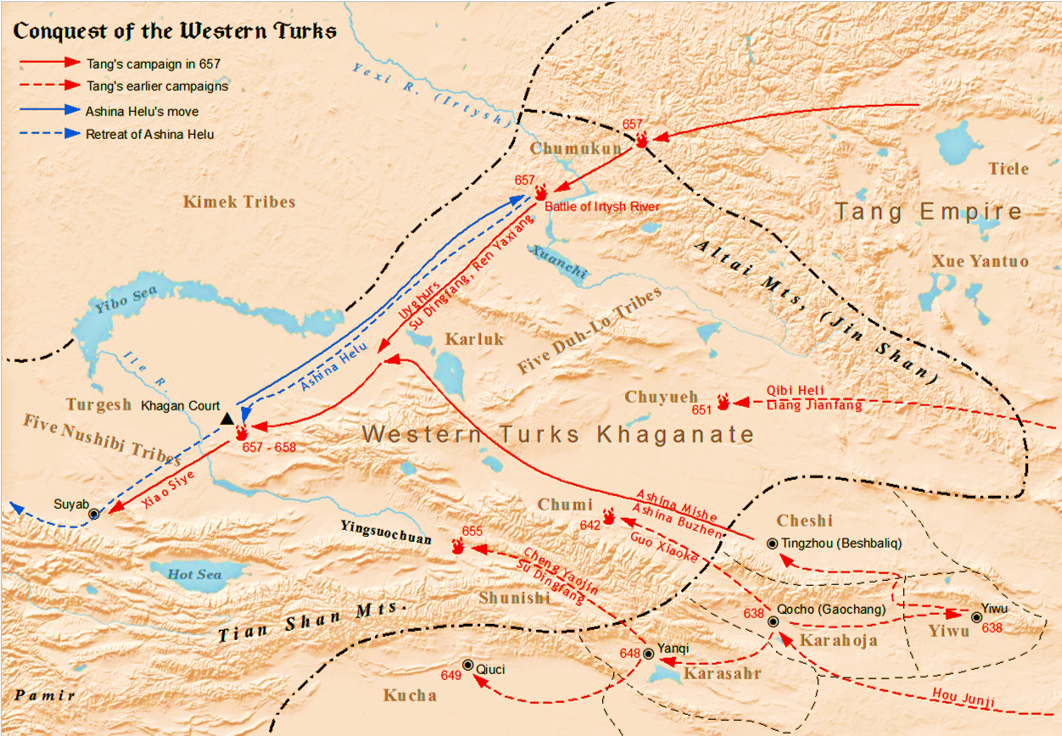
- Tang's campaigns against Western Turks
Date	655–657
Location	Central Asia
Result	Tang victory

Belligerents
Tang dynasty Former vassals of the Western Turks (Uighurs)	Western Turkic Khaganate

Commanders and leaders
Su Dingfang; Cheng Zhijie; Ashina Mishe; Ashina Buzhen; Xiao Siye; Ren Yaxiang	Ashina Helu (POW)

Strength
10,000+ Tang and Uyghur infantry and cavalry	100,000 infantry and cavalry

The conquest of the Western Turks was a military campaign from 655 to 657 led by the Tang dynasty generals Su Dingfang and Cheng Zhijie against the Western Turkic Khaganate ruled by Ashina Helu. The Tang campaigns against the Western Turks began in 640 with the annexation of the Tarim Basin oasis state Gaochang, an ally of the Western Turks. Several of the oasis states had once been vassals of the Tang dynasty but switched their allegiance to the Western Turks when they grew suspicious of the expansionist ambitions of the Tang. In 648, the Tang conquered Kucha and brought all of the Tarim Basin oasis states under their control. In 657 Su Dingfang commanded the main army dispatched against the Western Turks while the Turkic generals Ashina Mishe and Ashina Buzhen led the side divisions. They were reinforced by cavalry supplied by the Uyghurs, a tribe that had been allied with the Tang since their support for the Uyghur revolt against the Xueyantuo. Su Dingfang's army defeated Helu at the Battle of Irtysh River in a surprise attack while the Western Turks were chasing decoys.

The victory strengthened Tang control of the Western Regions, now modern Xinjiang, and brought the regions formerly ruled by the Khaganate into the Tang empire. Puppet qaghans and military garrisons were installed to administer the newly acquired territories. The Tang dynasty achieved its maximum territorial extent as its western borders reached the eastern frontier of the Umayyad Caliphate. Later on, Turkic revolts ended Tang hegemony beyond the Pamir Mountains in modern Tajikistan and Afghanistan, but a Tang military presence remained in Dzungaria and the Tarim Basin. Central Asia absorbed cultural influences from the conflict. Turkic culture and language spread into Central Asia, as did artistic and political influences from the Tang dynasty. Many of the Tang generals and soldiers stationed in the region were ethnically Turkic, and the prevalence of Indo-European languages in Central Asia declined with acceleration of Turkic migration. The Turks, Tibetans, and the Tang competed for control over Central Asia for the next few centuries.

== Background ==
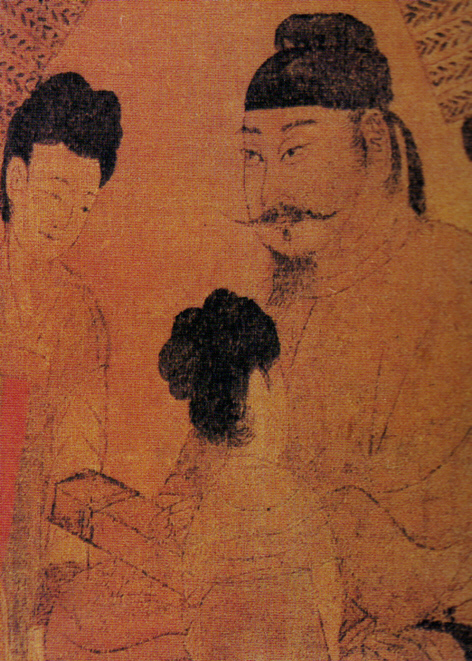
Emperor Taizong's campaigns against the oasis states brought the Tarim Basin under Tang control.

Map of Taizong's campaigns against the Tarim Basin oasis states, allies of the Western Turks.

The empire of the Tang dynasty (June 18, 618 – June 1, 907), was a cosmopolitan hegemon that ruled one of China's most expansive empires. Raids by the nomadic Khitans and Turks challenged Tang rule, and Tang rulers responded by pursuing strategies of divide and conquer, proxy warfare, tributes, and marriages.

Hostilities between the Tang and the Western Turks had existed since the founding of the dynasty. Emperor Gaozu, the first emperor of the Tang dynasty, aided the assassination of a Western Turkic qaghan on November 2, 619. Facing the threat of both the Western and Eastern Turkic Khaganates, Gaozu's successor, Emperor Taizong, formed an alliance with the Western Turks against the Eastern Turks, adopting a policy of allying "with those who are far away to fight those who are close."

The westward expansion of the Tang dynasty began with their wars against the Eastern Turks. Taking advantage of the political discord in the Eastern Turkic Khaganate, Taizong annexed the territory of the Eastern Turks in 629, beginning a period of rule that would last for the next fifty years. The nomads were driven out of the Ordos region and southern Mongolia and Taizong was declared a Great Khan by the defeated tribes, who surrendered and submitted to Tang rule.

=== Battles in the Tarim Basin ===
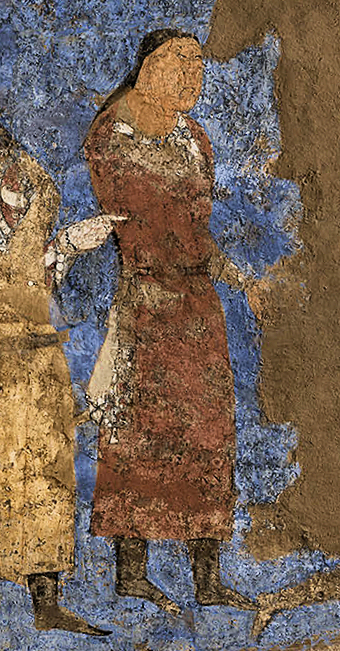
Western Turk officer at the court of king Varkhuman in Samarkand. Afrasiab mural, probably painted between 648 and 651.

Several of the Tarim Basin oasis states switched their allegiance from the Tang dynasty to the Western Turks. The oasis states Kashgar and Khotan surrendered to the Chinese in 632, as did the kingdom of Yarkand in 635. Tang military campaigns expanded further west against the remaining kingdoms of the Tarim Basin in southern Xinjiang beginning in 640. The king of Gaochang refused to submit to the Tang dynasty as a suzerain. In 638, Emperor Taizong ordered a campaign led by general Hou Junji to invade Gaochang. Tang troops arrived in 640 and annexed the kingdom. A Western Turk army, sent to support Gaochang, retreated as the Tang forces approached.

The nearby kingdom of Karasahr grew wary of the Chinese troops stationed at Gaochang, now under Tang domination. It refused to send tribute to the Tang court and formed an alliance with the Western Turks. A Tang campaign led by commander Guoxiao Ke captured the kingdom in 644 and installed a Tang loyalist as ruler. Military assistance by the Western Turks failed to deter the Tang forces. With the support of the Western Turks, the puppet ruler was later deposed, and another military campaign, led by the Tang general Ashina She'er, a member of the Turkic Ashina royal family, arrived in 648 to re-establish Tang control.

After conquering Karasahr, She'er led his forces to the kingdom of Kucha. The army of Kucha, comprising 50,000 soldiers, lost to She'er. The king of Kucha fled with his soldiers to the kingdom of Aksu. After a forty-day siege, the king was captured and the Kucha forces surrendered on January 19, 649. Tang military garrisons were installed in the region to administer the annexed oasis states. These garrisons, known as the Four Garrisons of Anxi, were located in Kucha, Kashgar, Khotan, and Karasahr.

== Campaign ==
Ishbara Qaghan (Ashina Helu) was a Turk general under the Tang stationed in Gansu. He rebelled against the Tang and migrated westward, declaring himself Shabulou Qaghan and ruler of the Western Turkic Khaganate. After uniting the Turkic tribes, Ashina Helu led repeated raids on Tang settlements and also attacked the Tarim Basin, bringing the territory under Turkic rule for the next six years. Emperor Gaozong sent two armies against Ashina Helu; one led by Su Dingfang, and another led by Ashina Mishe and Ashina Buzhen, who were Western Turk rivals of Ashina Helu.

Su Dingfang was a commander from south-central Hebei who was familiar with the military affairs of the Central Asian steppes. He had been in contact with military leaders from the region and was responsible for leading the attack against the military camp of Illig Qaghan, qaghan of the Eastern Turks. He had also led a regional militia during the transition from Sui to Tang. As a result of his accomplishments, Su was one of nine commanders of multi-ethnic origins invited by Emperor Gaozong to a military event in 655. The Turkic general Ashina Zhong, second cousin of Ashina She'er, was another commander in attendance.

Su's forces consisted of Tang soldiers and 10,000 Uyghur horsemen. The Uyghur troops were provided by Porun, son of the Uyghur leader Tumidu Eltabar and enthroned by Emperor Taizong. The Uyghurs were allied with the Tang, who had supported their revolt against the Tiele Xueyantuo tribe. Porun joined Su as a vice commander of the Uyghur cavalry in the military campaign against the Western Turks. The commanders of the Uyghur cavalry were the Yanran Protector-General and Vice Protector-General, administrators of the Yanran Protectorate near the Western Shouxiang military garrison north of the Yellow River in the Ordos Loop.

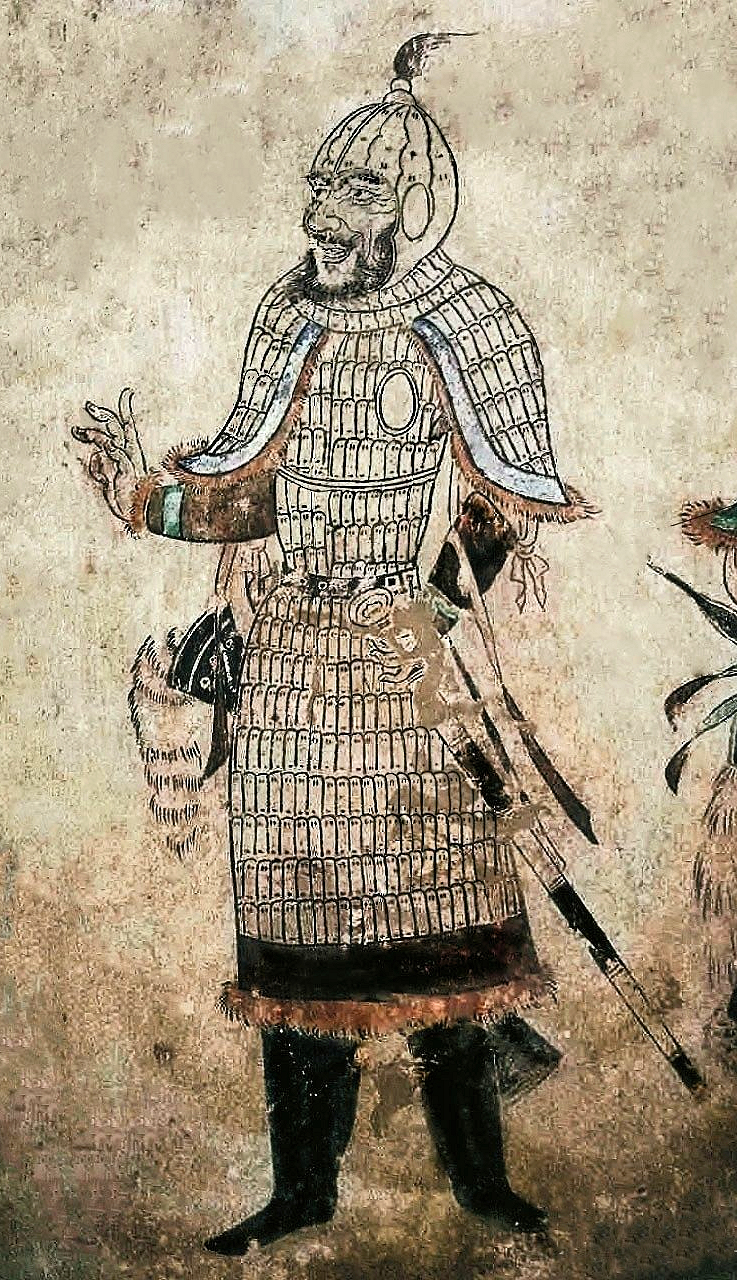
Chinese officer of the Guard of Honour. Tomb of Princess Chang-le (长乐公主墓), Zhao Mausoleum, Shaanxi province. Tang Zhenguan year 17, i.e. 644

Su's troops left Ordos in March and arrived in Kyrgyzstan in November, a journey spanning 4,800 km (3,000 mi) miles across steppes and desert. Su avoided stopping at the resource rich oasis states, which suggests that the Chinese troops may have relied on livestock for food instead of a supply train, a tactic used by the steppe nomads. The campaign continued through the winter, when the steppes were covered in snow. Describing the journey's ordeal, Su Dingfang is reported to have said: "The fog shed darkness everywhere. The wind is icy. The barbarians do not believe that we can campaign at this season. Let us hasten to surprise them!"

Su recruited former tribal vassals of the Western Turks to his side. The Chumukun tribe offered their support after they were defeated by Su and the Nishu tribe aided Su after their children and wives, originally captured by Helu, were returned along with gifts offered by the Tang.

The battle was fought along the Irtysh River (Yexi) near the Altai Mountains. Helu's army, consisting of 100,000 cavalry, was lured into an ambush by a decoy contingent of 10,000 "Tang and Uighur" troops. The 10,000 troops were dispatched to attack Helu's forces. When they retreated, Helu gave chase and fell into a two pronged attack by tightly packed Tang infantry wielding long spears and cavalry under Su's command. Helu's forces charged the Tang infantry formation three times but failed to break through. The Tang cavalry charge routed Helu's forces, killing tens of thousands of horsemen. The next day, Turkic tribes loyal to Helu surrendered while Helu escaped to Chach (Tashkent in modern Uzbekistan) with several hundred horsemen. The Tang forces gave chase and defeated Helu again, capturing him. Another account states that Helu was captured by the residents of Tashkent who handed him over to the Tang. On the way back to the Tang capital, Helu is reported to have written:

I am a defeated and ruined war captive, that's it! The former emperor [Taizong] treated me generously, but I betrayed him. In my present defeat, Heaven has vented its fury at me. In the past I have heard that Han law stipulates that executions of men be carried out in the city marketplace. When we arrive in the capital, I request to Zhaling [the tomb of the previous Tang emperor Taizong] to atone for my crimes to the former emperor. This is my sincere desire.

Gaozong received Helu's plea and agreed to his request, despite a Tang law ordering the execution of captured rebel generals and kings. In accordance with Confucian rituals, he was sent to Taizong's tomb where Gaozong spared his life, and then to the capital's Ancestral Temple where the captive was presented again, mirroring ancient rituals celebrating victorious armies. Helu felt disgraced by Taizong and committed suicide a year later while still in captivity. He was buried in a mound decorated with a stele outside the emperor's park. The tomb served as a military trophy, visible to the emperor's visitors entering the park, symbolizing the loyalty of the Qaghan to the Emperor and the Tang military victories against the Western Turks.

== Historical significance ==
=== Aftermath ===
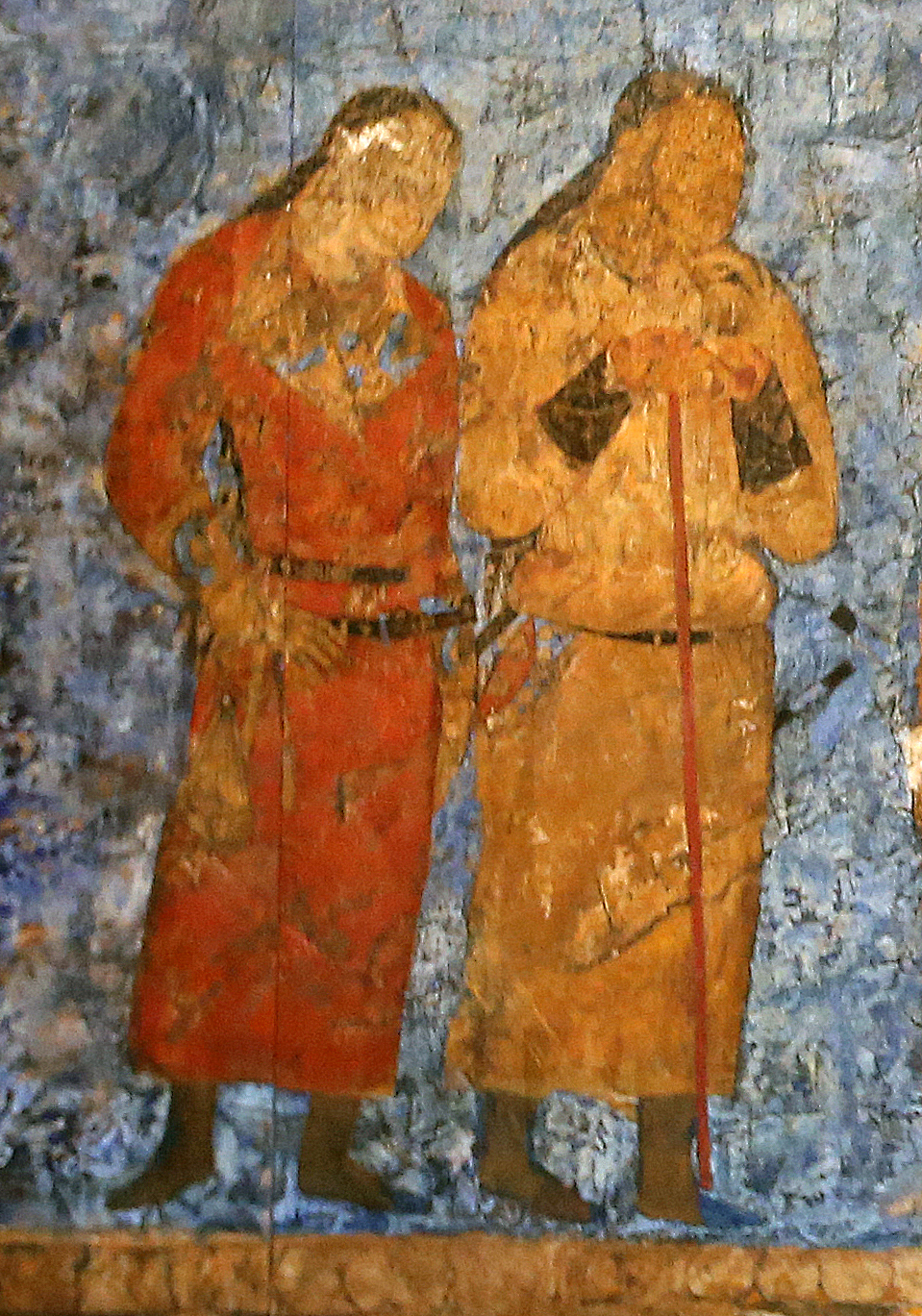
Turkish officers during an audience with king Varkhuman of Samarkand. 648–651, Afrasiyab murals, Samarkand.

Su Dingfang continued his career as a general and later led Tang forces in a war against Baekje in 660.

The defeat of the Western Turks strengthened Tang rule over modern Xinjiang, administered by the Protectorate General to Pacify the West, and led to Tang suzerainty over the regions previously under the control of the Western Turks. The fall of the Khaganate brought the Altai Mountain region under Tang control and the residing Three Karluk tribes were governed in newly established prefectures led by tribal chiefs, now commander-in-chiefs under the Tang. Another prefecture, the Jinman Bridle Prefecture, was created for the Chuyue tribes living in the southern Dzungar basin. The Amu Darya valley, the Tarim Basin, and the area beyond the Pamir Mountains, all former suzerains of the Western Turks, were placed under Tang control.

The Tang dynasty achieved its maximum extent following its conquest of the khaganate. The inhabitants of the new territory did not become sinicized like many of the other kingdoms and tribes conquered by the Tang. Tang military activity in Central Asia brought in a wave of Turkic migrants serving in the Tang military as soldiers and generals, leading to the spread of Turkic language and culture. At the same time, the prevalence of Indo-European languages in the Western Regions was on the decline. Central Asia also absorbed cultural influences from Tang China. Central Asian art incorporated Tang stylistic features, like the sancai three color glaze used in pottery. Chinese coins remained in circulation in Xinjiang after the decline of the Tang. Cultural remnants of Tang architectural influence are still visible in the Buddhist architecture of Dunhuang, on the border between the Western Regions and the Hexi Corridor.

The sheer size of the newly conquered lands made it difficult to govern through the Tang military garrisons. The Tang emperor Gaozong appointed two puppet qaghans to rule over the Western Turks, who were later overthrown in a rebellion that began in 662. The revolt reduced the Tang's western territory to Ting Prefecture (Beshbalik), Dzungaria in northern Xinjiang and ended direct Tang control of Central Asia beyond the Pamir Mountains in modern Tajikistan and Afghanistan. The expansion of the Tibetan Empire from the south threatened China's hold on the Tarim Basin. Tibet invaded the Tarim Basin in 670 and took Anxi again in 677 and the Tang returned in 679, defeating the Turks under Ashina Duzhi and capturing Suiye. However it is uncertain if the Four Garrisons were fully restored. Tang forces regained the area in 693, restoring the Anxi Protectorate and the Four Garrisons. The conflict between Tibet and the Tang continued for the remainder of the Tang dynasty. According to the Old Book of Tang, the Shule Kingdom (Kashgar) had been destroyed by the Tibetans. However by 698, envoys from the king of Shule offered gifts to the Tang. The Tang later sent someone to bestow investiture on the king of Shule in 728.

At its maximum extent, Tang expansion brought China into direct contact with the rising Umayyad Caliphate. China's western borders reached the eastern frontier of the caliphate. Following the Arab defeat of Sassanid Persia in 651, the caliphate began its expansion into Central Asia, competing with the Tang's sphere of influence in the region. Chinese and Islamic troops finally clashed at the Battle of Aksu in 717 and the Battle of Talas in 751. Though victorious in 717, the Chinese lost against the Arabs, now under Abbasid rule, and the Arab army captured Chinese papermaking craftsmen. An Arabic record of the conflict claims that the battle led to the introduction of papermaking to the Islamic world. In 755 the An Lushan Rebellion occurred and the Tang dynasty withdrew 200,000 soldiers from the Western Regions to protect its capital. The cut off garrisons lasted until the early 790s when they were conquered by the Tibetan Empire.

=== Puppet qaghans ===
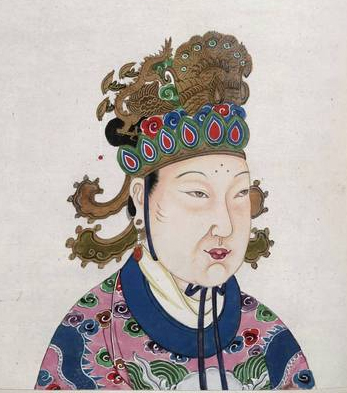
Empress Wu Zetian sent Yuanqing and Khusrau to succeed their fathers as proxy rulers of the Western Turks

The Tang emperor Gaozong installed two puppet qaghans, the cousins Ashina Buzhen and Ashina Mishe, to control the former territory of the Western Turks by proxy. Buzhen and Mishe were enemies of Helu who had aided Su Dingfang during his campaign against Helu and the Western Turkic Khaganate. Gaozong divided the ten tribes of the area among the two cousins. Buzhen (Jiwangjue Qaghan) governed the five Nushibi tribes located in the west while Mishe (Xingxiwang Qaghan) governed the five Duolu tribes located in the east.

The son of Buzhen, Khusrau (Huseluo), and the son of Mishe, Yuanqing, resided in Chang'an, the capital of the Tang, while their fathers administered the former khaganate as qaghans. However, Mishe was killed by Buzhen in 662 and Buzhen was himself killed in 666. Empress Wu Zetian sent Yuanqing and Khusrau westward in 685 to succeed their fathers as proxy rulers.

Neither of the qaghans were able to successfully exert control. Turkic tribes resisted Yuanqing's rule and he was captured by the Tibetan Empire between 686 and 689. After his release, Yuanqing chose to return to the Tang instead of the Western Turks. He was executed in 692. Khusrau was able to bring the western tribes temporarily under his rule, but was defeated in 690 during an invasion by the Second Turkic Khaganate, and he too was forced to escape to the Tang with 60,000 followers. Later attempts to install puppet qaghans failed, and the title was reduced to a symbolic position in the Tang court.

== See also ==
- Tang campaigns against the Western Turks
- Tang dynasty in Inner Asia
