= Afrasiab murals =

Instance of Sogdian art in Samarkand, Uzbekistan

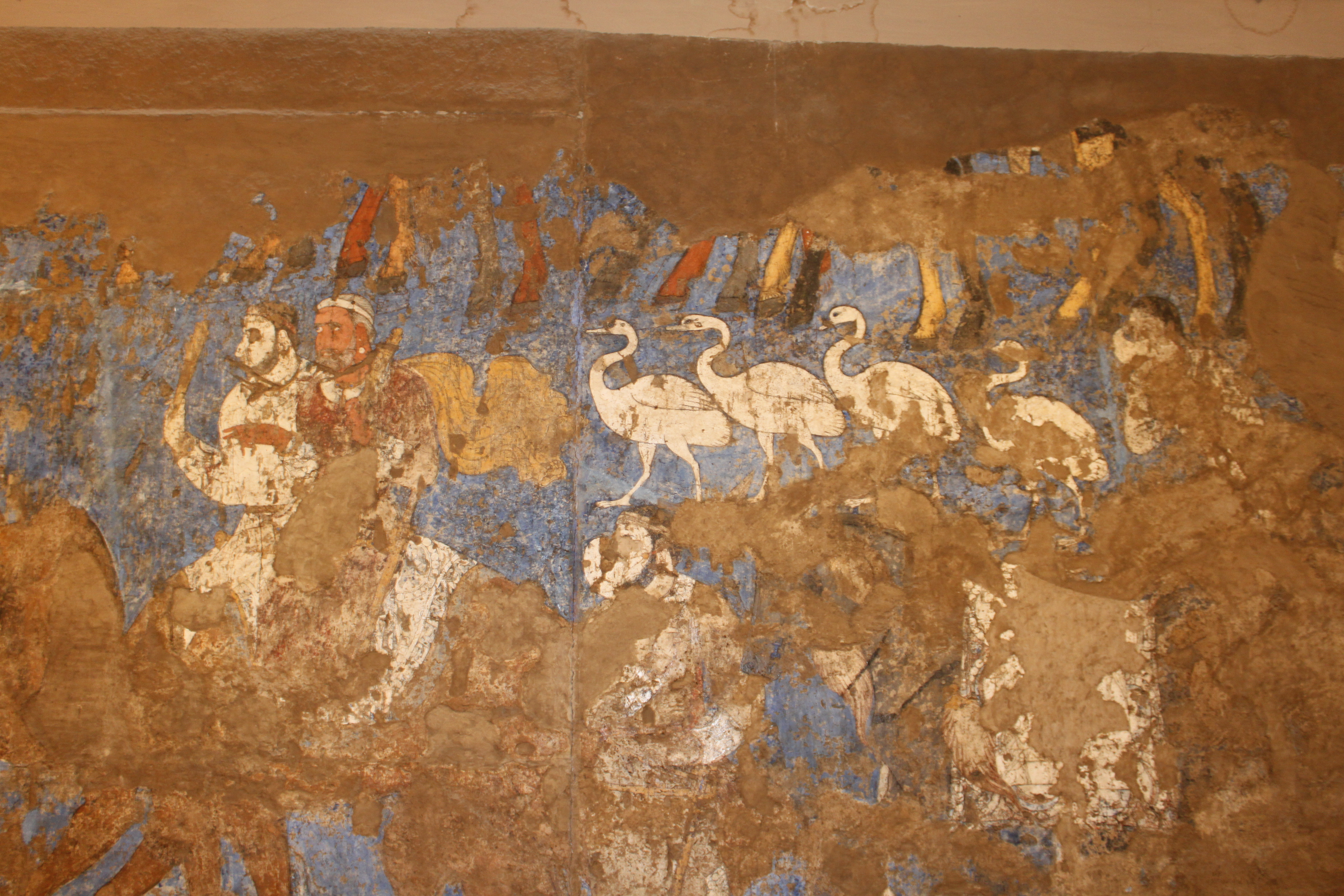
- Detail of the Ambassadors' Painting.
- Created: 648-651 CE
- Discovered: Afrasiyad, Samarkand, Uzbekistan; 39.669300°N 66.993400°E
- Present location: Afrasiab Museum of Samarkand, Uzbekistan
- Culture: Sogdian

Location
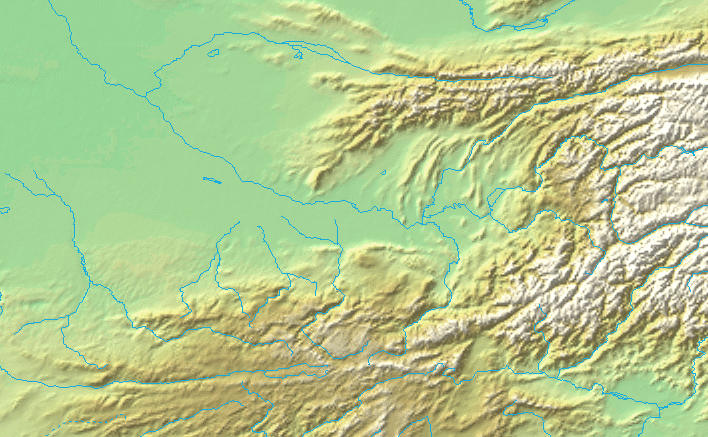

The Afrasiab murals, also called the Paintings of the Ambassadors, is a rare example of Sogdian art. It was discovered in 1965 when the local authorities decided to construct a road in the middle of Afrāsiāb mound, the old site of pre-Mongol Samarkand. It is now preserved in a special museum on the Afrāsiāb mound.

== Description ==
The paintings date back to the middle of the 7th century CE. They were probably painted between 648 and 651 CE, while the Western Turkic Khaganate was in decline and the Tang dynasty was increasing its territory in Central Asia. Paintings on four walls of the room of a private house at the site depict three or four lands neighbouring Central Asia: On the northern wall, China (a Chinese festival, with the Empress on a boat, and the Emperor hunting); on the Southern Wall, Samarkand (i.e.; the Iranian world: a religious funerary procession in honor of the ancestors during the Nowruz festival); on the eastern wall India (as the land of astrologers and of pygmies, though this painting is largely destroyed).

The topic of the main (or western) wall, which depicts Kökturk soldiers escorting ambassadors from various parts of the world (Korea, China, Iranian principalities etc.), is debated. Boris Marshak, a leading expert on Sogdian painting and the excavator of Panjikent, holds that since Sogdian painting always depicts gods on the top of the main wall, the central figure might be the ruler of Samarkand Varkhuman or the goddess Nana. However, as the Turks are guiding the envoys but are not themselves ambassadors, it has been suggested that the painting depicts the Khagan, with the possible candidates being Ashina Buzhen or more probably Ashina Mishe.

=== Description of the four walls ===
The four walls of the palatial room in Afrasiab seem to depict the four principal civilizations influencing in Central Asia at that time: Chinese, Indian, Iranian, and Turkic. The Chinese chronicles of the Book of the Later Han appears to describe such mural depicting the four civilizations as a common feature in the region:

The country of He, also named Qushuangnijia (Koschânyah), or Guishuangni [...] To the east of the city, there is a storied pavilion inside of which are paintings. On the north wall, the former emperors of China. To the east, the princes and king of the Turks and the Hindus. To the west, the Persians and those from Byzantium. Every morning the prince of this country goes to this pavilion to pray, and then retreat."

— New Book of Tang, Book 221B.

=== Inscription mentioning Varhuman and the ambassadors ===
Inscriptions at the site mention the king of Samarkand Varkhuman. Written in Sogdian, the inscription, reads:

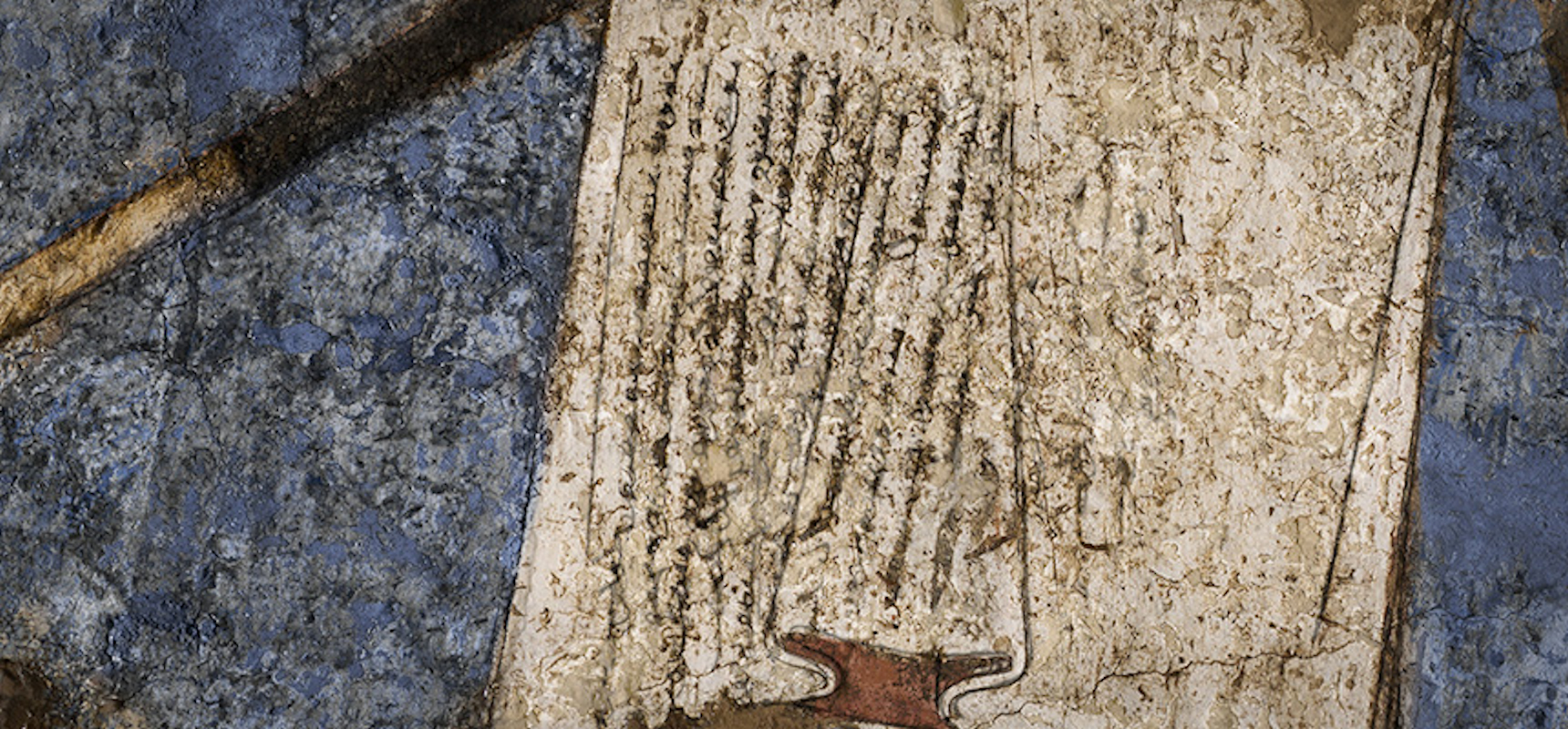
Afrasiab Sogdian inscription

When King Varkhuman Unash came to him [the ambassador] opened his mouth [and said thus]: "I am Pukarzate, the dapirpat (chancellor) of Chaganian. I arrived here from Turantash, the lord of Chaganian, to Samarkand, to the king, and with respect [to] the king [now] I am [here]. And with regard to me do not have any misgivings: About the gods of Samarkand, as well as about the writing of Samarkand I am keenly aware, and I also have not done any harm to the king. Let you be quite fortunate!" And King Varkhuman Unash took leave [of him]. And [then] the dapirpat (chancellor) of Chach opened his mouth.

— Inscription on an ambassador's robe.

=== Western Turk officers and courtiers ===
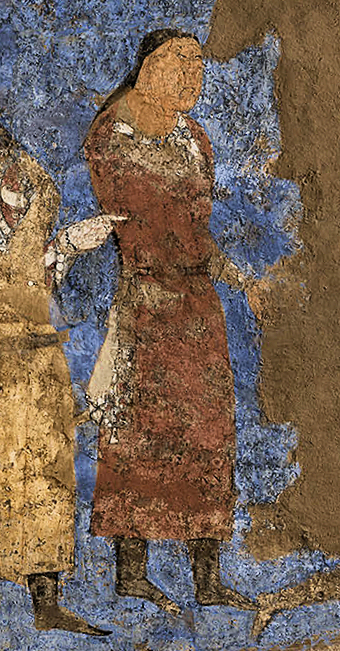
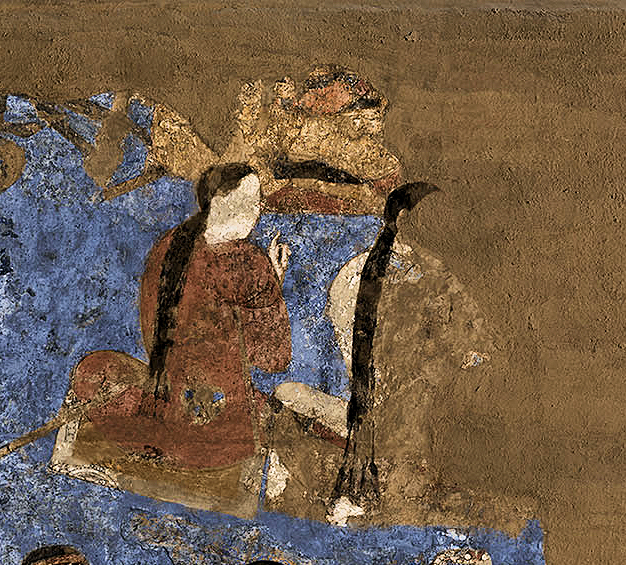
Western Turk officer and seated courtiers, Afrasiab, 7th century CE.

In contrast with the ambassadors from various countries, the Western Turks in the mural do not bear gifts. They are considered attendants to the scene, and military escorts to the foreign ambassadors. They are recognizable as Turks by their long plaits.

The ambassadors from various countries may have been paying homage both to king Varkhuman and possibly a Western Turk Khagan, both nominal vassals of China. The numerous Turkic officers and courtiers who are present may suggest the predominance of the Western Turks at the court of Samarkand during this time period.

In the mural, the Western Turks are ethnic Turks, Nushibis, rather than Turkicized Sogdians, as suggested by their facial features and faces without beards. They are the most numerous ethnic group in the mural, and are not ambassadors, but rather military attendants. Their depiction offers a unique glimpse into the costumes of the Turks in the 6-7th century CE. They typically wear 3 or 5 long plaits, often gathered together into a single long cloth. They have ankle-long monochromic sleeved coats with two lapels. This fashion for the collar is first seen in Khotan near Turfan, a traditional Turkic area, in the 2nd-4th century CE. They have low black sharp-nosed boots. They wear gold bracelets with lapis lazuli or pearls.

== Overview ==
There are four walls, with murals in various states of preservation. There were two registers, an upper and lower one, but the upper register of the murals was essentially destroyed by bulldozers during the construction works that led to the discovery of the murals.

Various reconstructions for the whole mural have been proposed.

Afrasiab murals

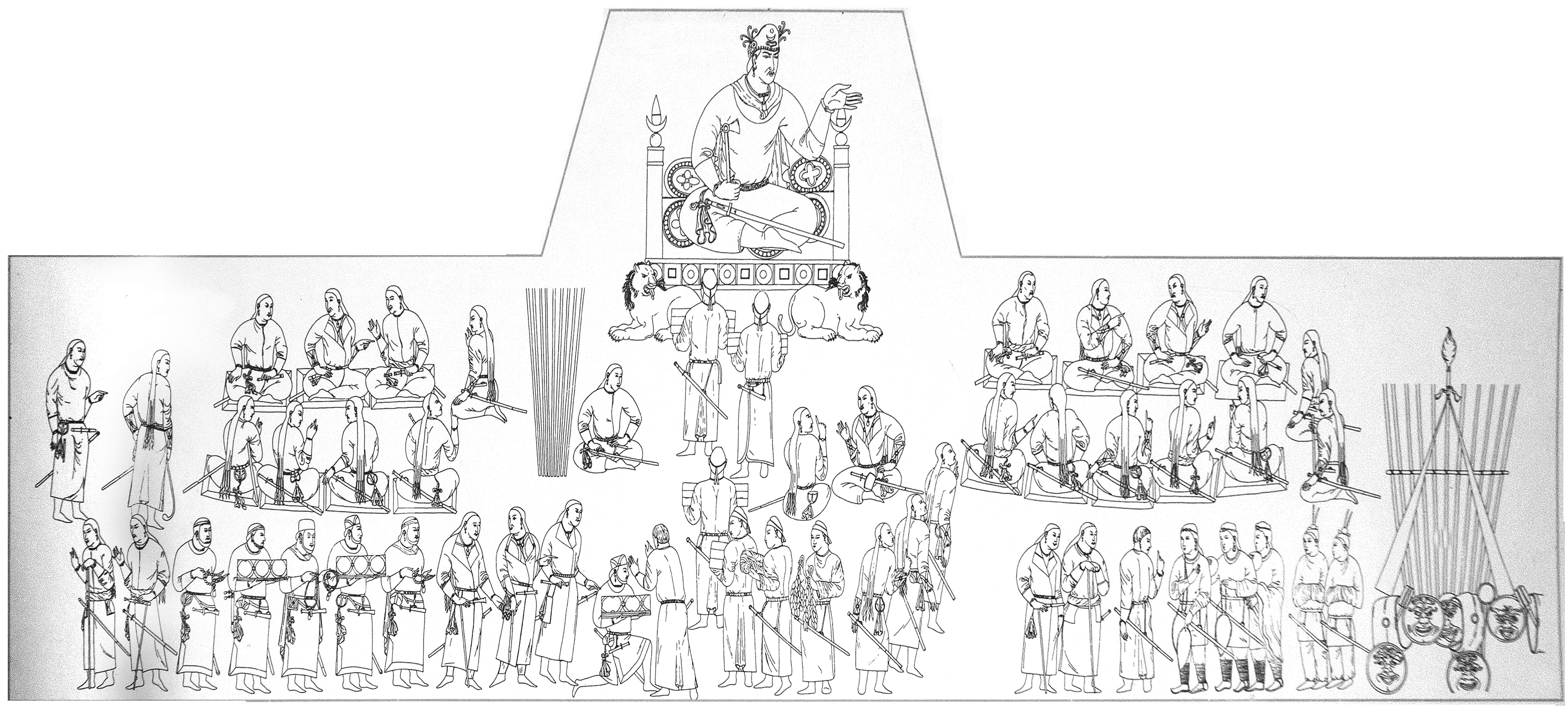
Afrasiab west wall (reconstruction).

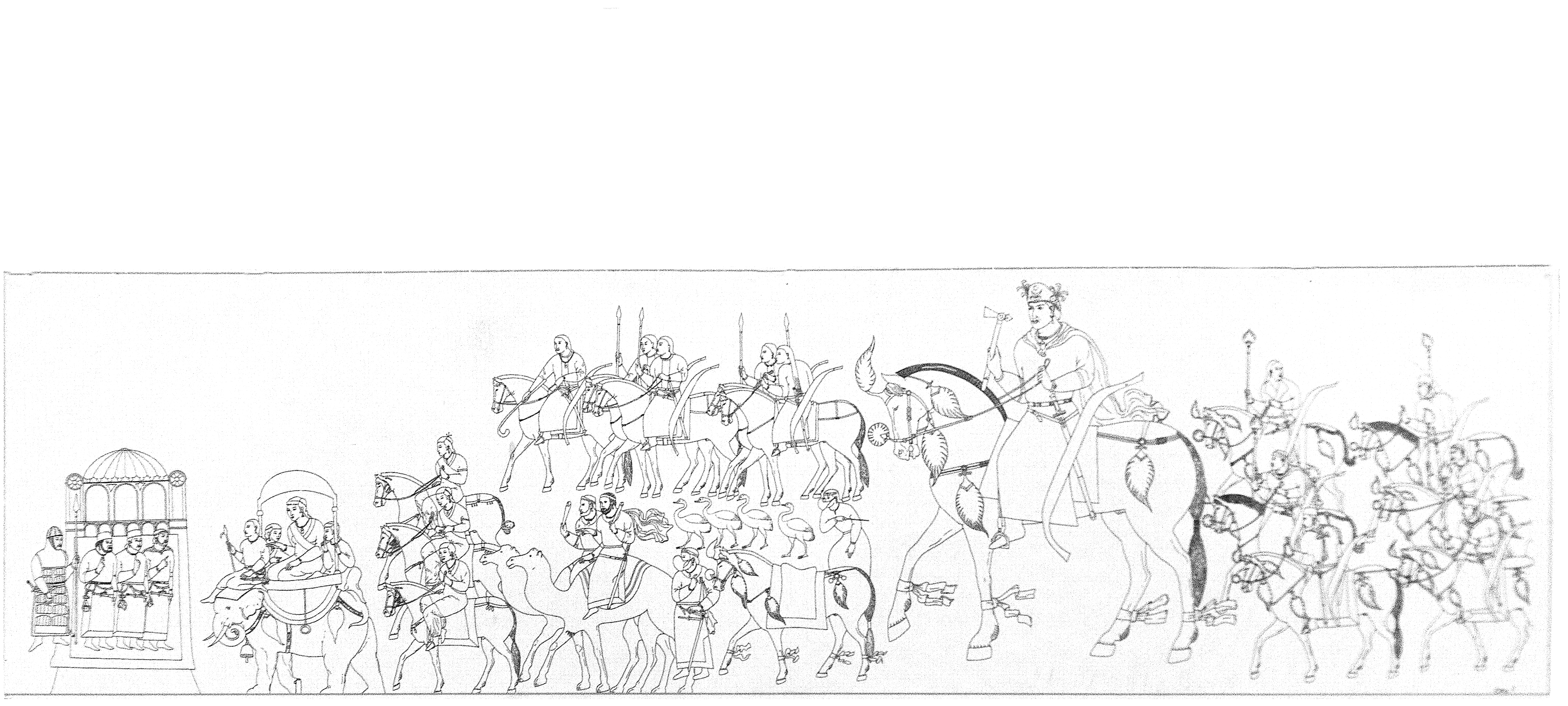
Afrasiab south wall (reconstruction)

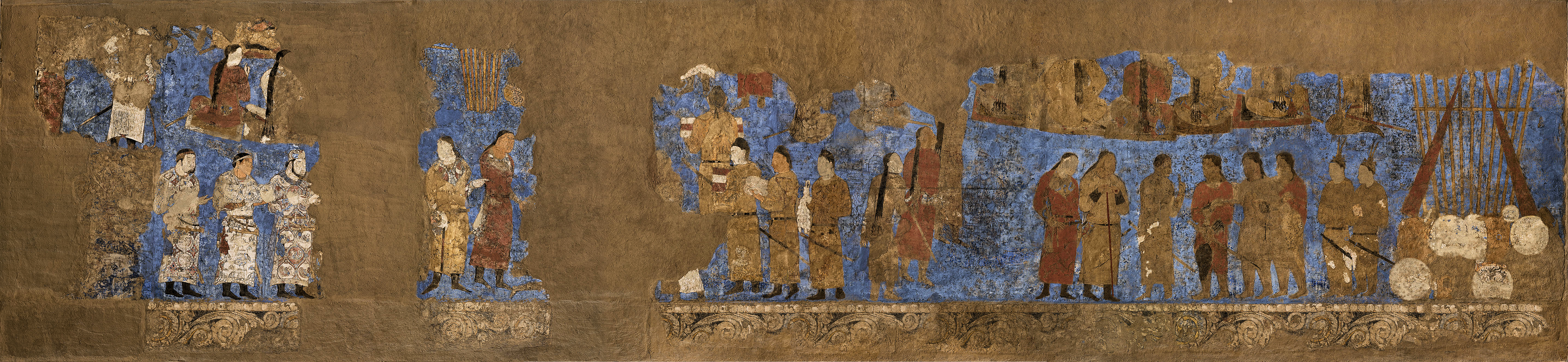
West wall
Ambassadors from various countries, paying hommage to king Varkhuman and possibly Western Turk Khagan Shekui, both nominal vassals of China. Numerous Turkish officers and courtiers are present.

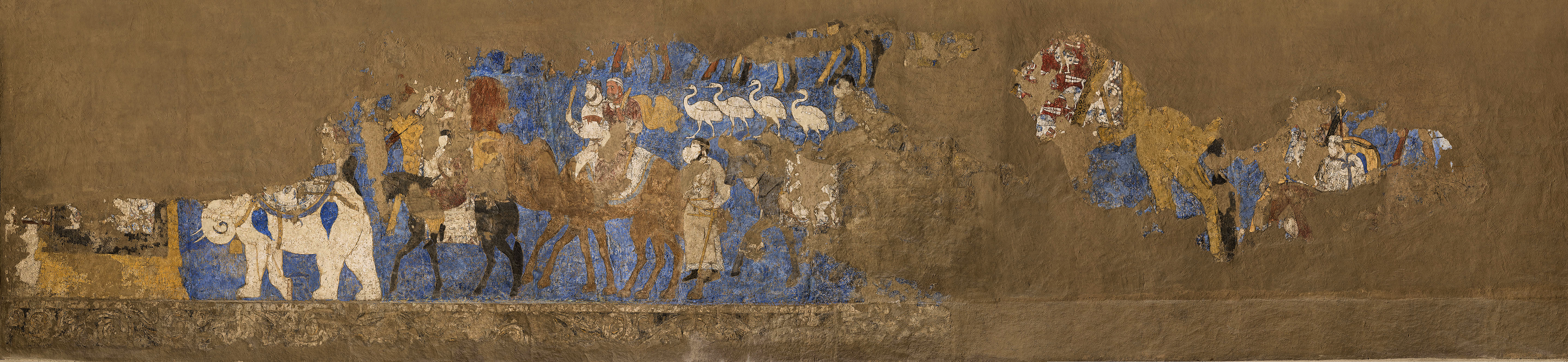
South wall
Funeral procession led by King Varkhuman, in honour of his predecessor Shishpir.

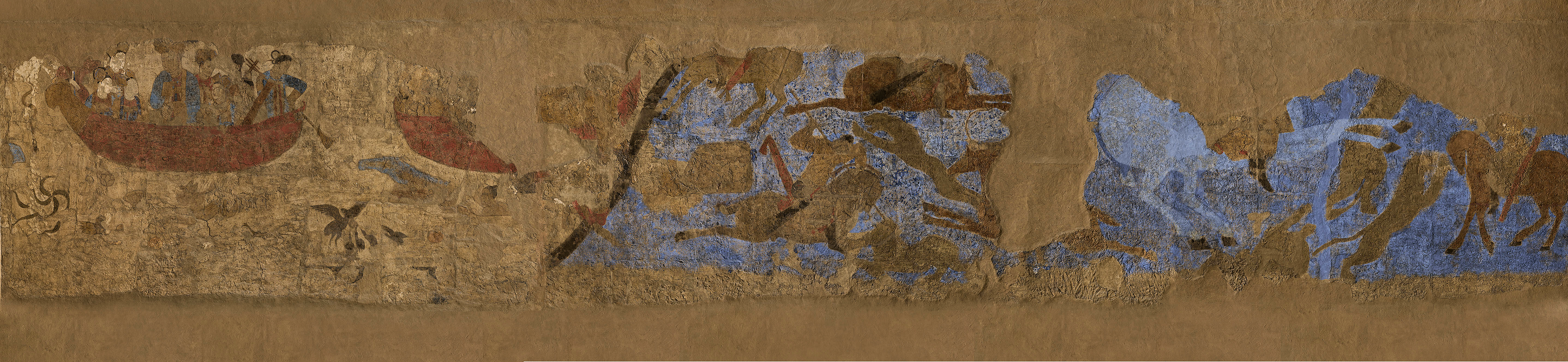
North wall
"Chinese panel". Emperor Taizong is seen hunting, and the Chinese Empress is seen on a boat, on a visit to the Western Turk Khagan Shekui.

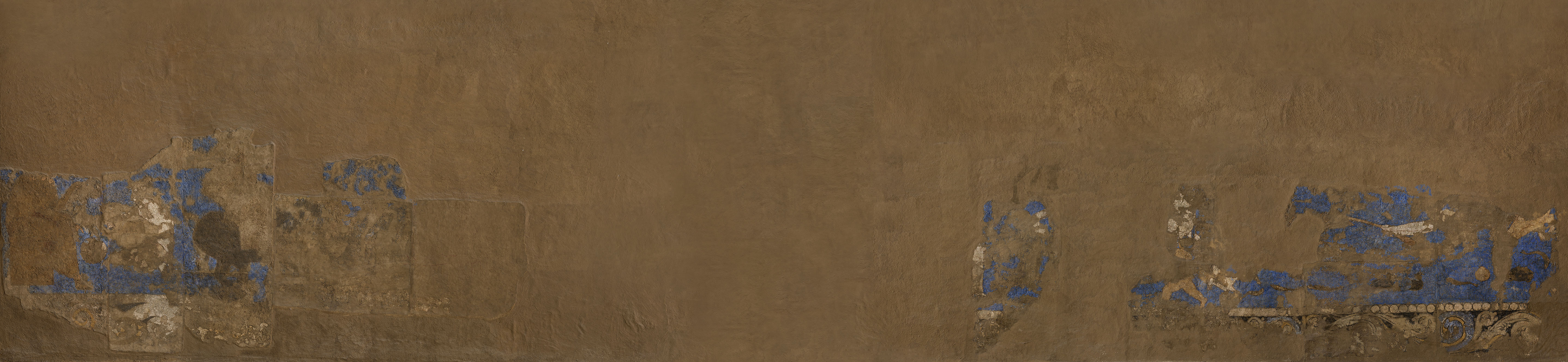
East wall
Possible scenes of India.

== Original murals (details) ==
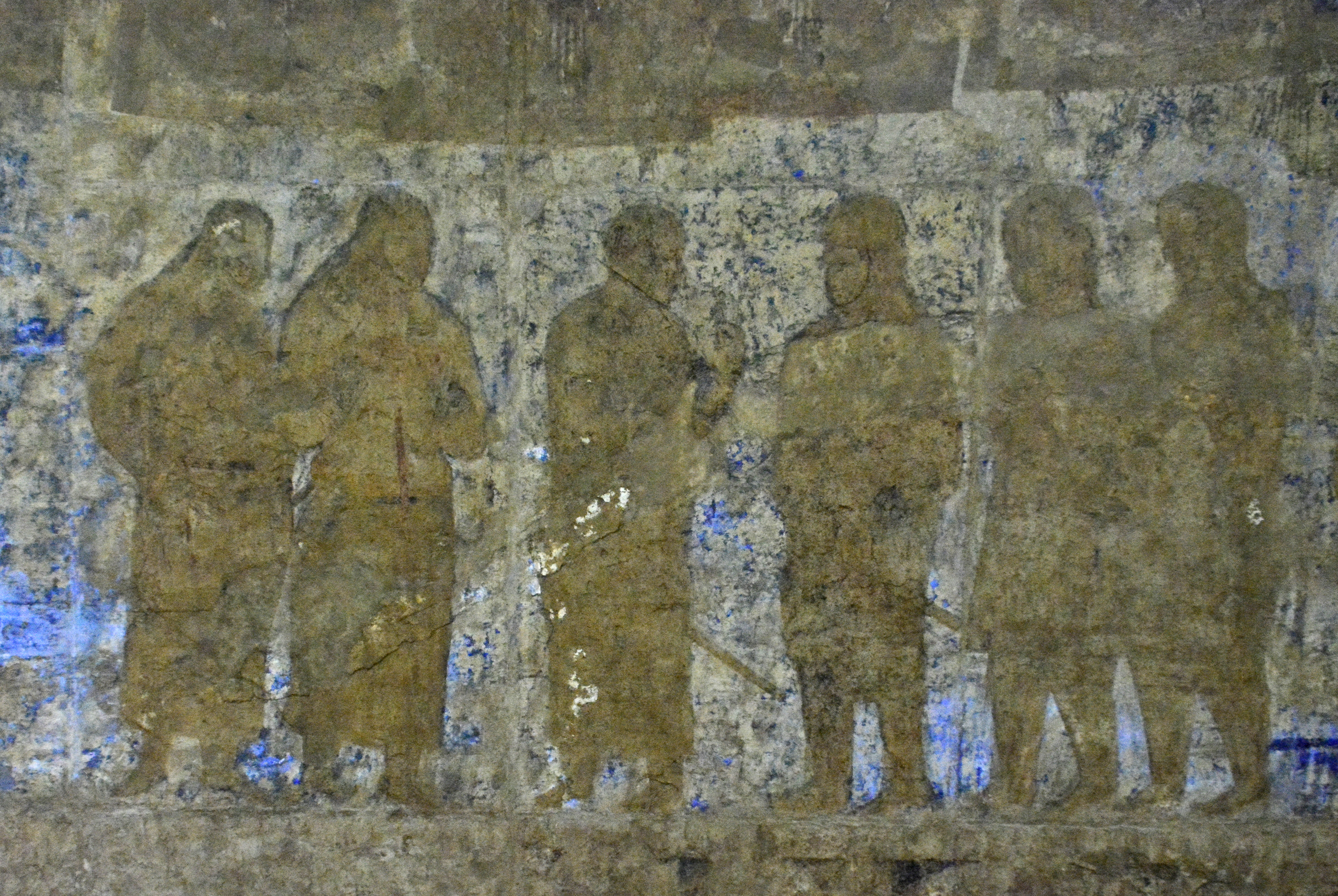
Afrasiab Palace Fresco 7th-8th century. Sogdian Chamberlains & Interpreter Introduce Tibetan Messengers

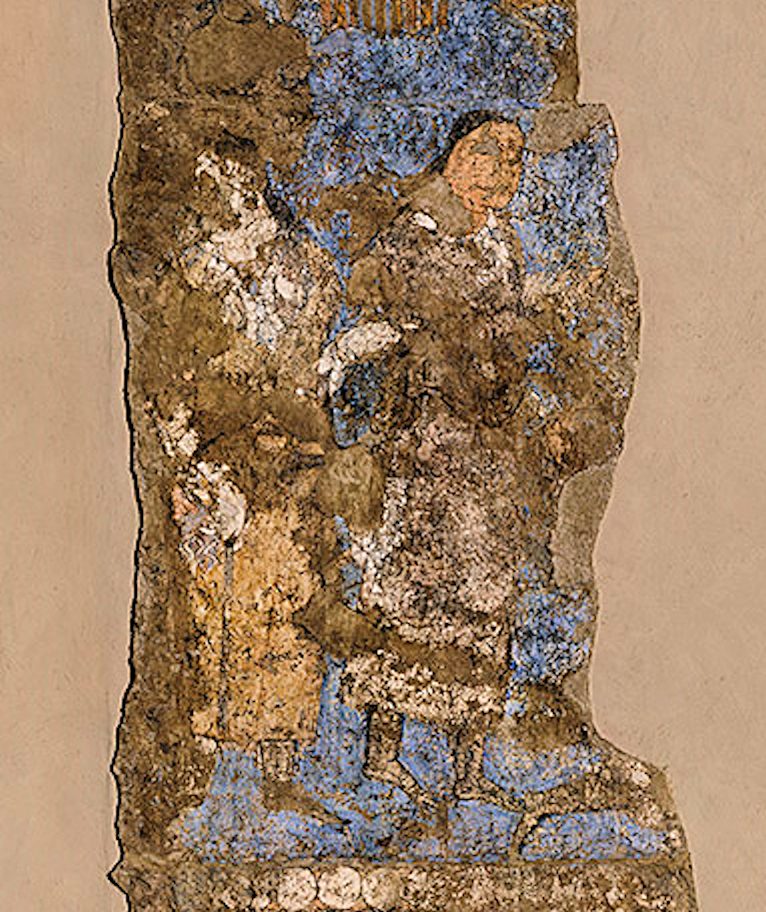
Turkic dignitaries visiting king Varkhuman in Samarkand. One of them is labeled as coming from Argi (Karashahr in modern Xinjiang).

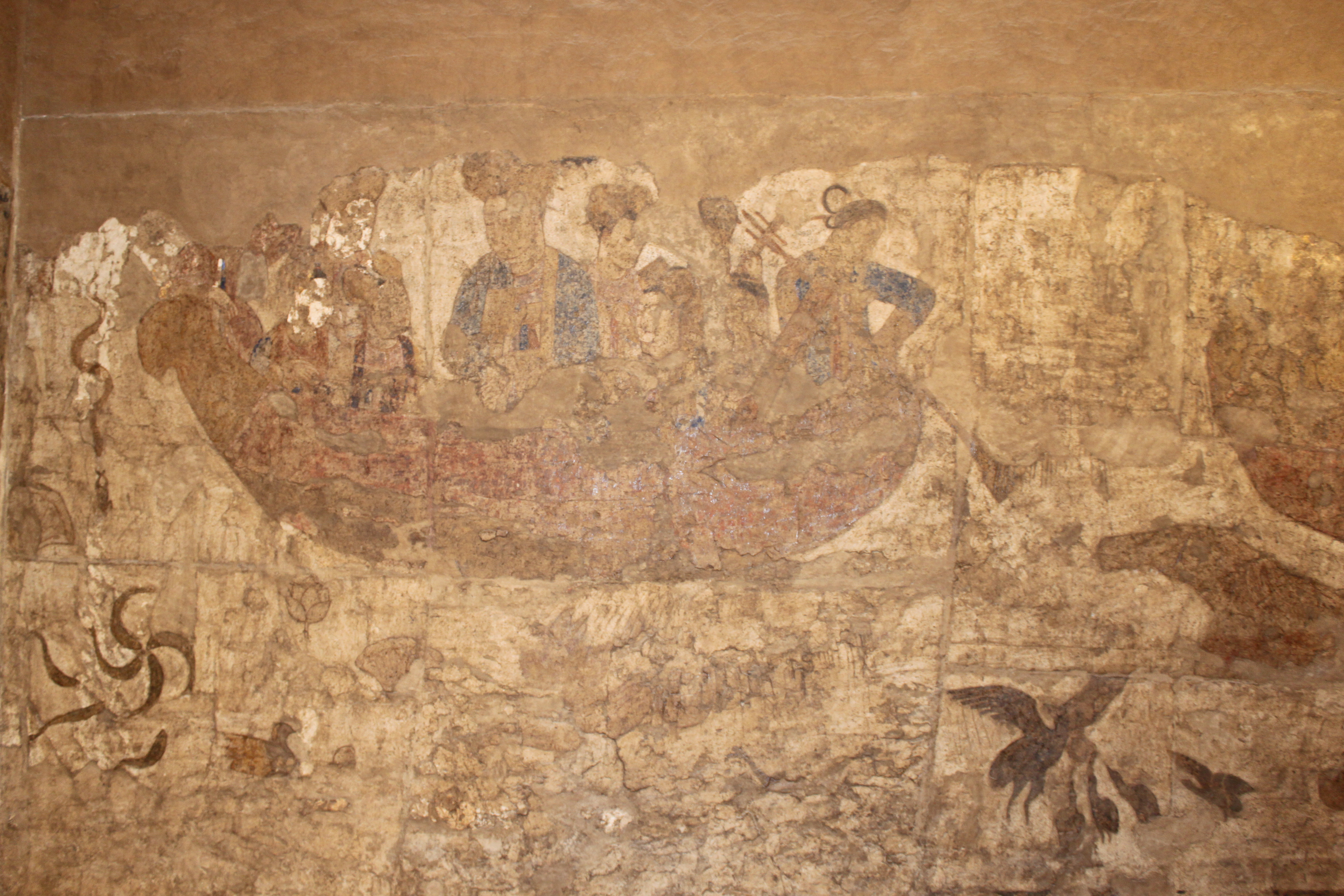
Chinese boat

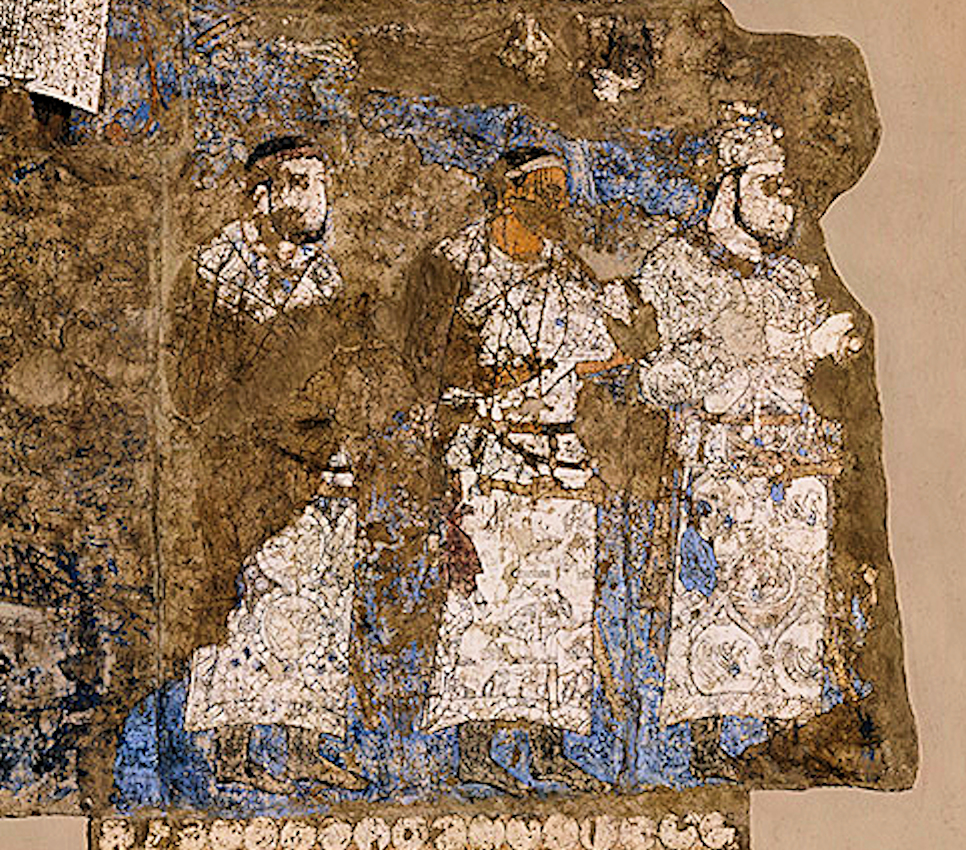
Ambassadors from Chaganian (central figure, inscription of the neck), and Chach (modern Tashkent) to king Varkhuman of Samarkand. 648-651 CE, Afrasiyab murals, Samarkand.

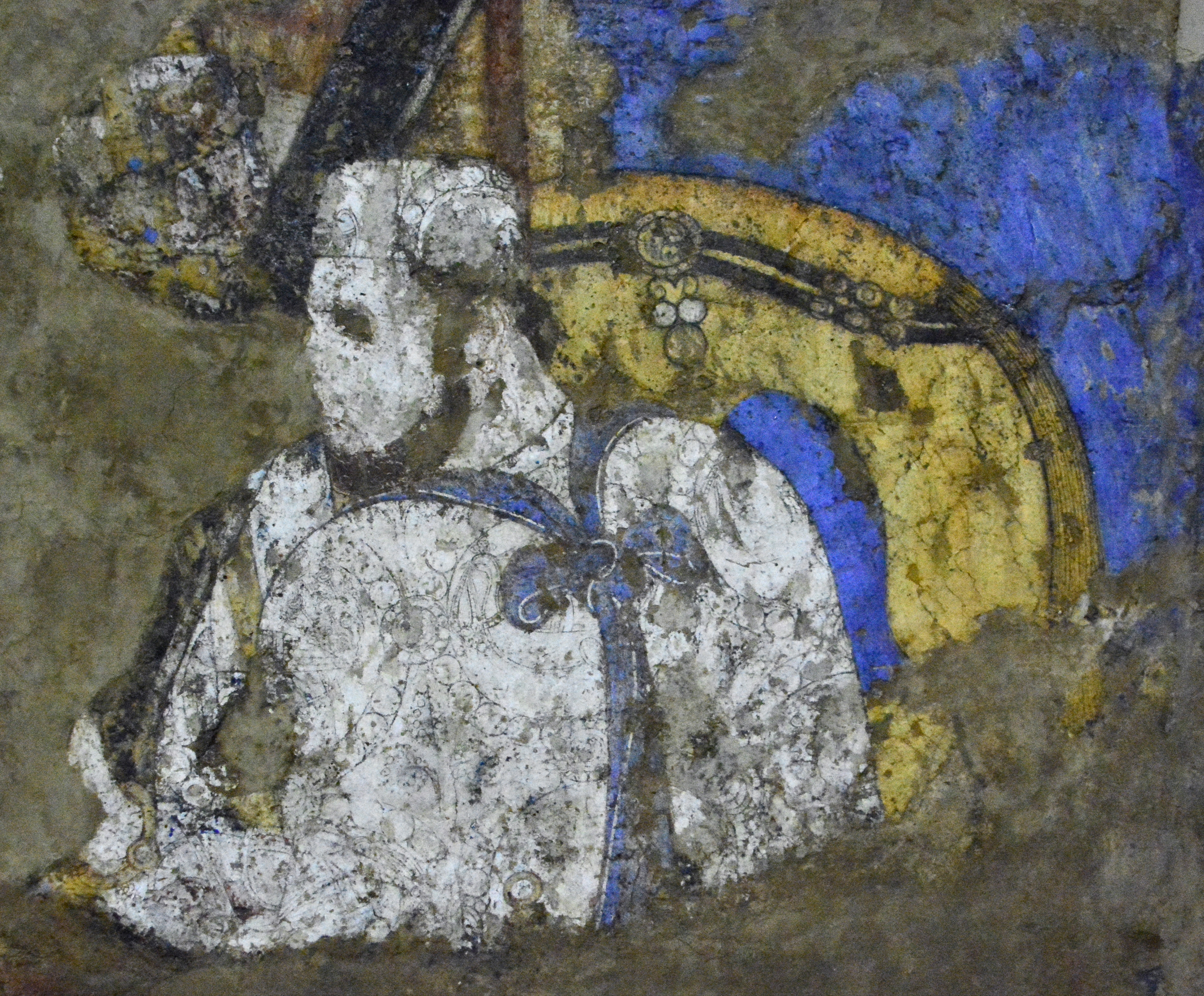
Afrasiab Palace Fresco 7th-8th century. Detail of a horserider

== Restoration ==
In early 2014, France declared that it would finance the restoration of the Afrasiab painting.

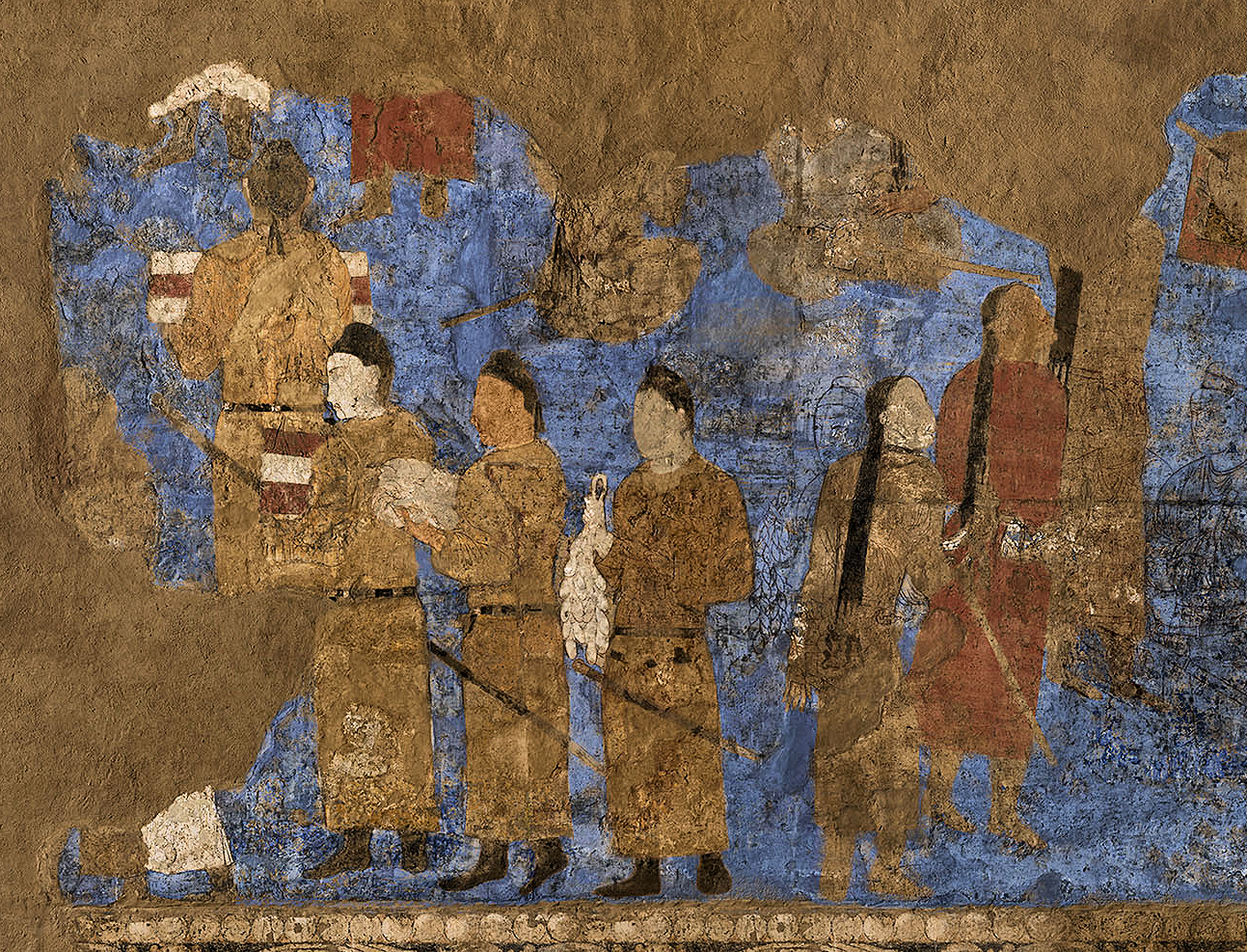
Afrasyab Chinese Embassy (left), carrying silk and a string of silkworm cocoons, and Turkish delegates (right), recognizable by their long plaits.

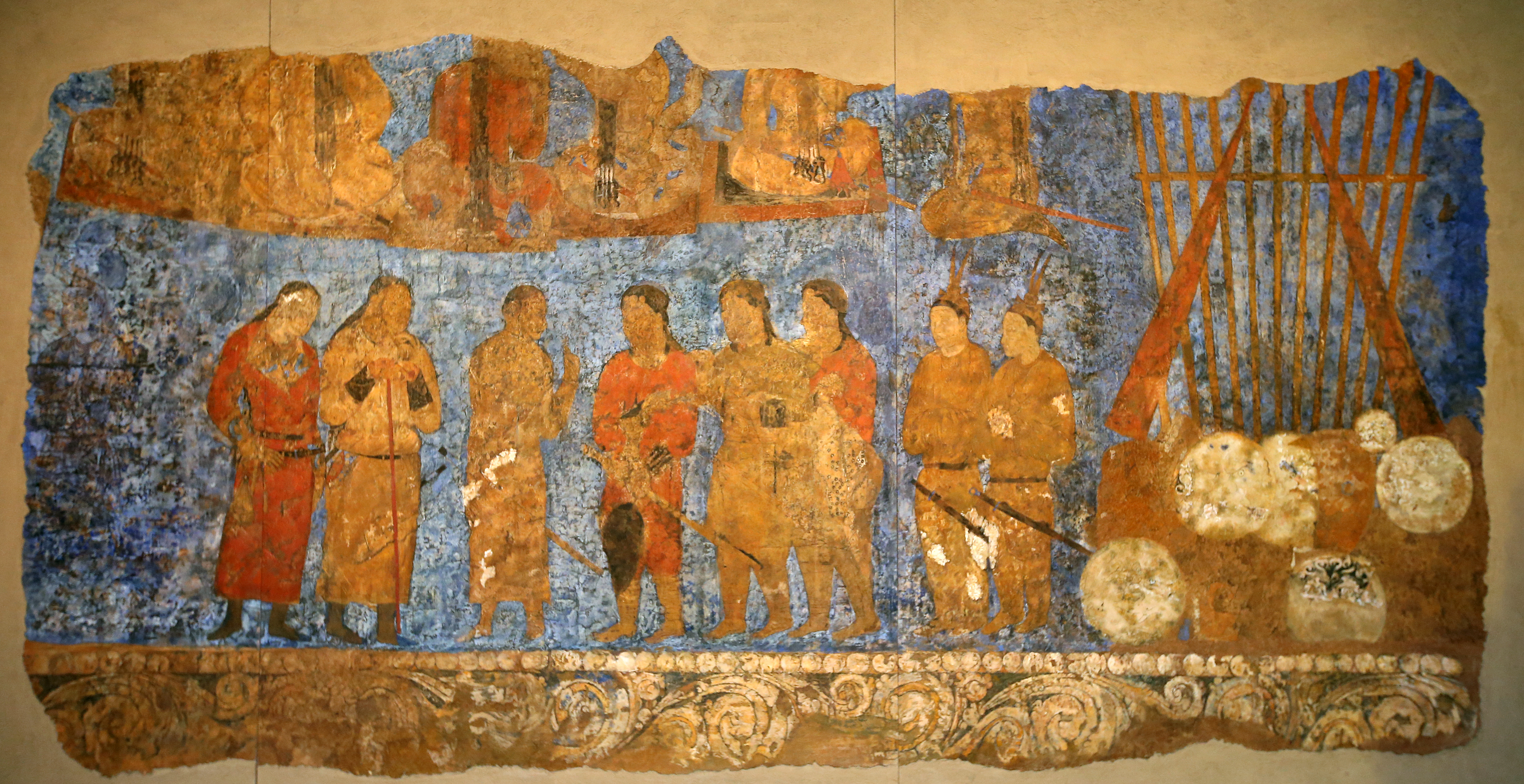
Wall painting at the Ambassador's Hall in Afrosiab

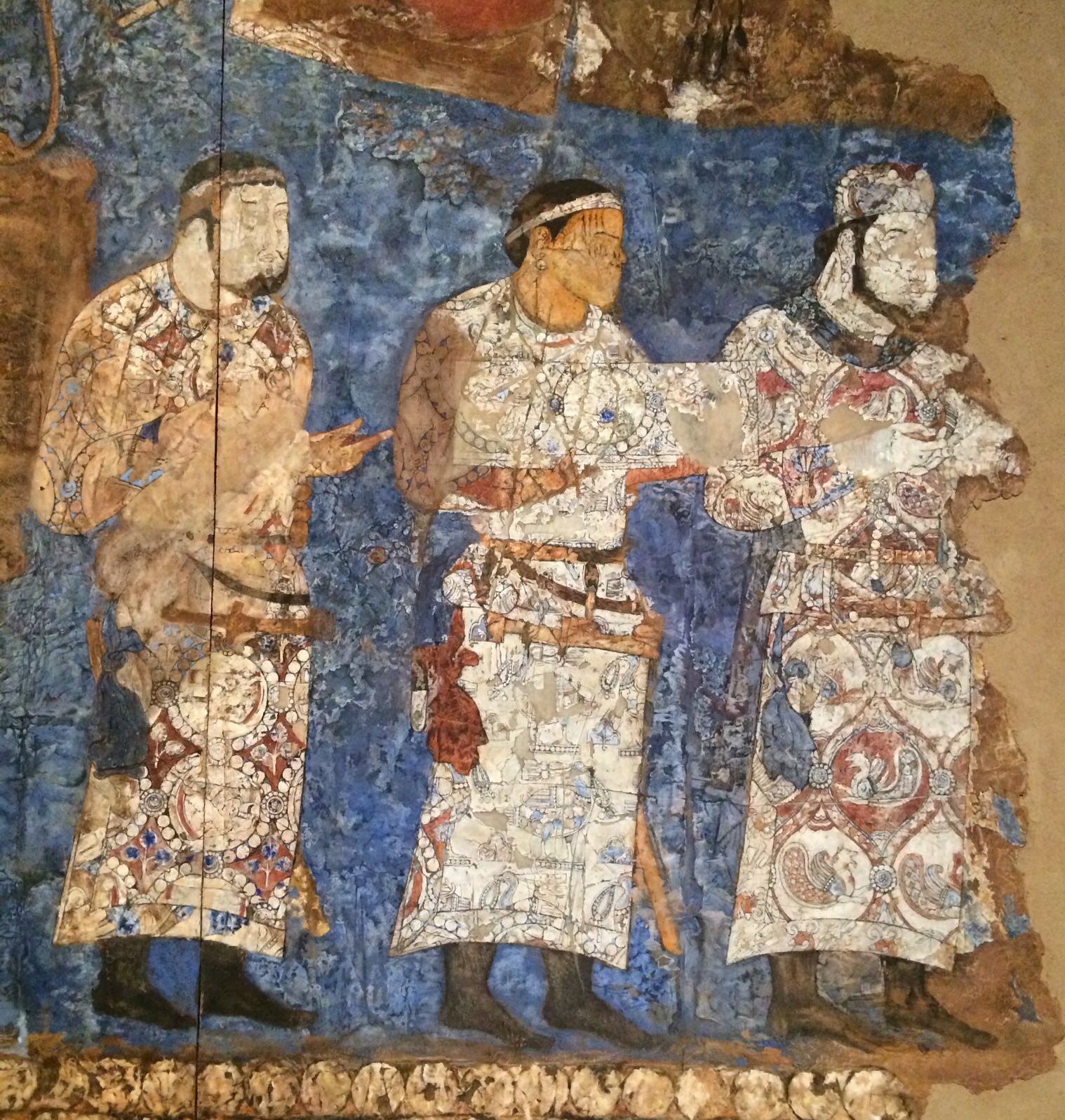
Ambassadors from Chaganian (central figure, inscription of the neck), and Chach (modern Tashkent) to king Varkhuman of Samarkand. 648-651 CE, Afrasiyab murals, Samarkand. The delegate to the right has a Simurgh design on his dress.

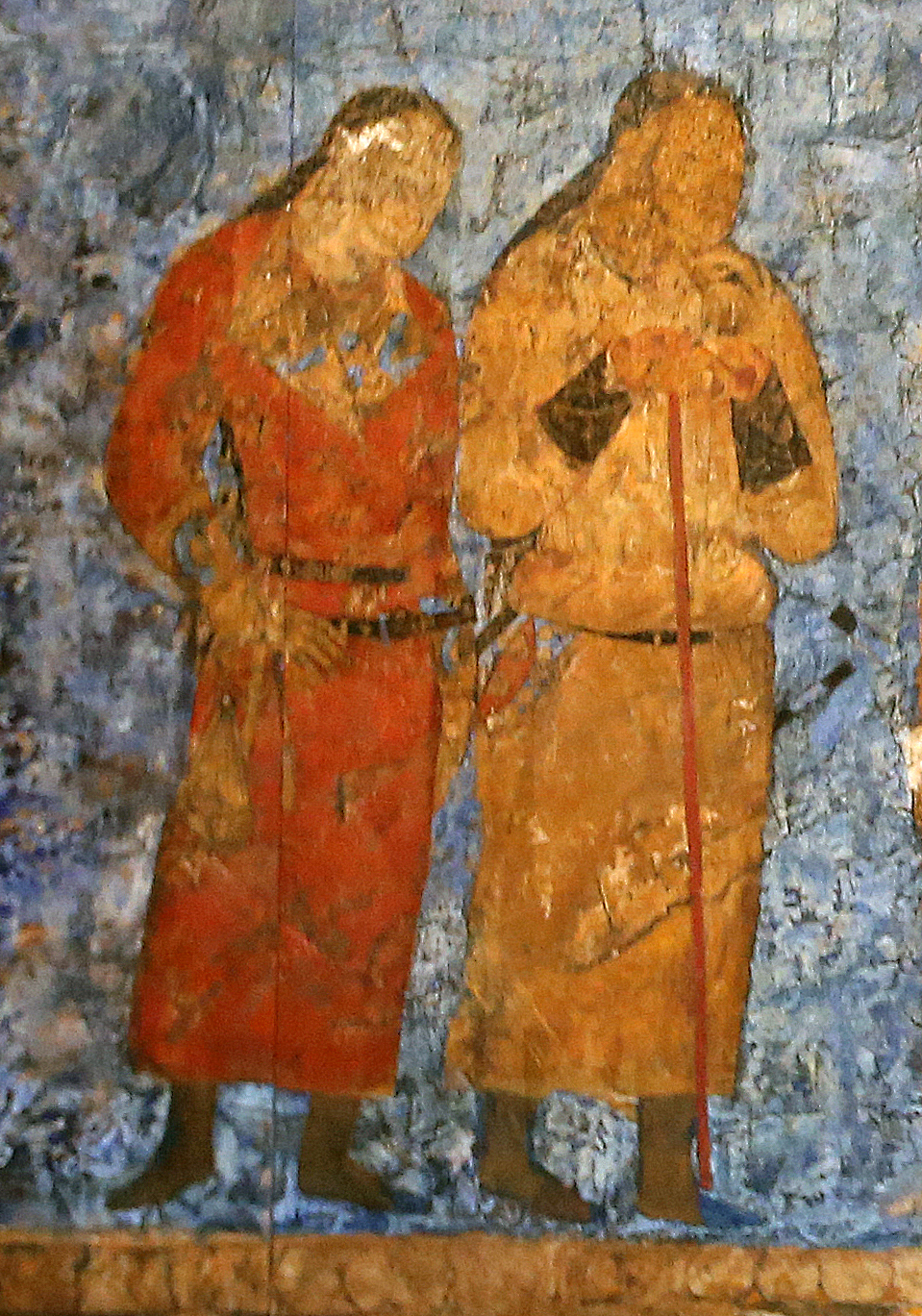
Turkish officers during an audience with king Varkhuman of Samarkand. 648-651 CE, Afrasiyab murals, Samarkand.

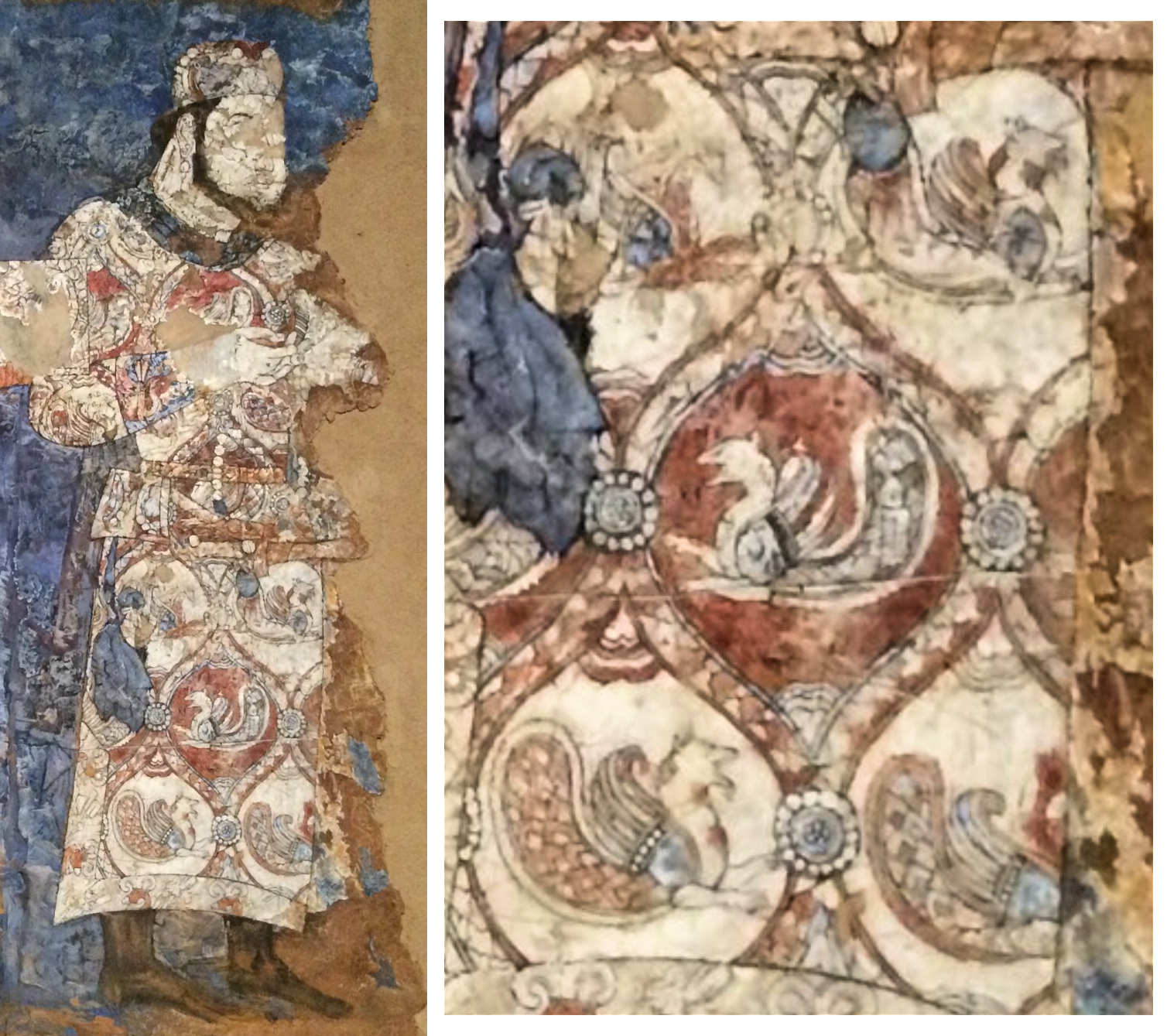
Delegate with Simurgh design on his dress in the Afrasiab murals, 648-651 CE.

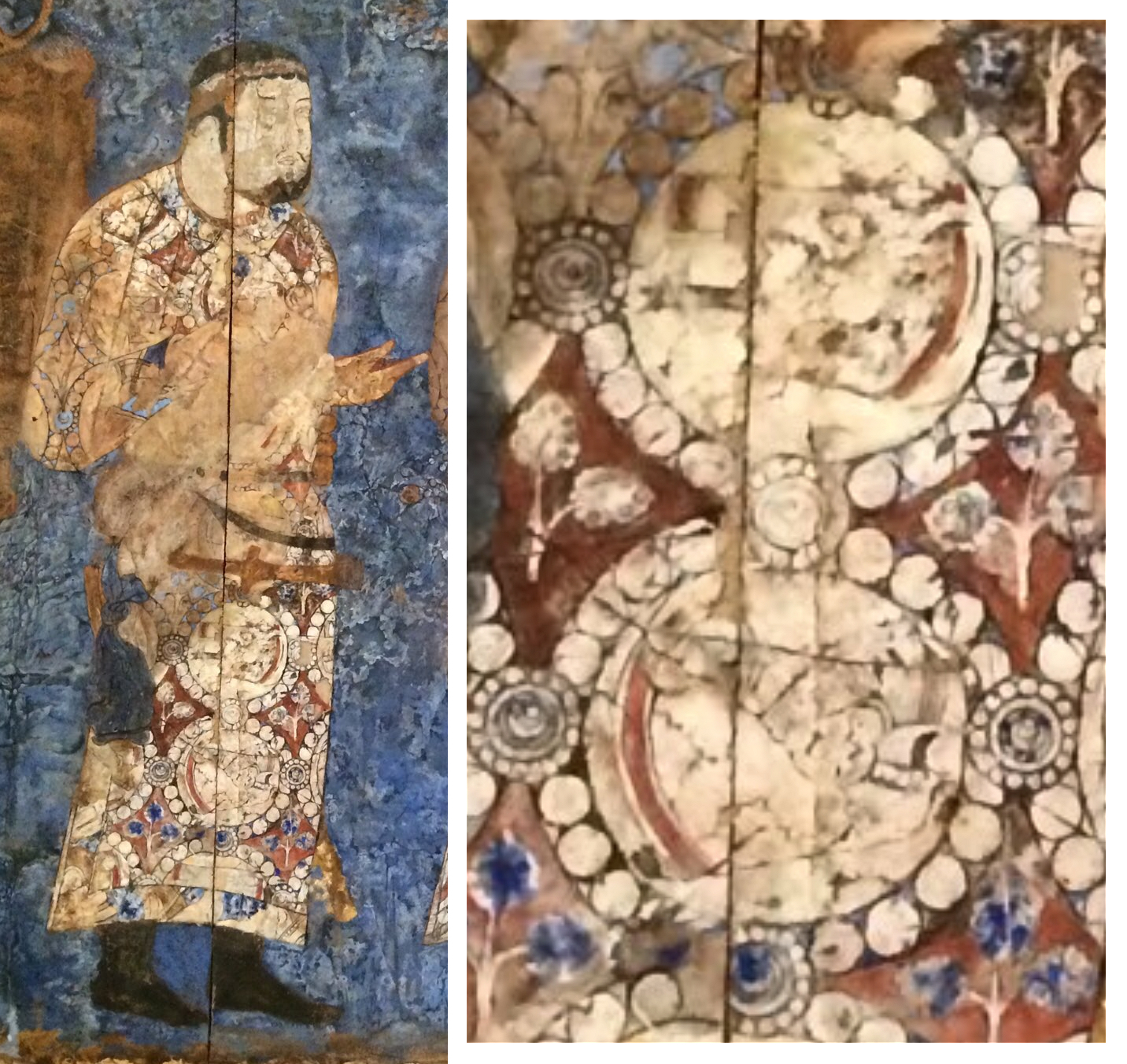
Delegate with boar head symbol on his dress in the Afrasiab murals 650 CE.

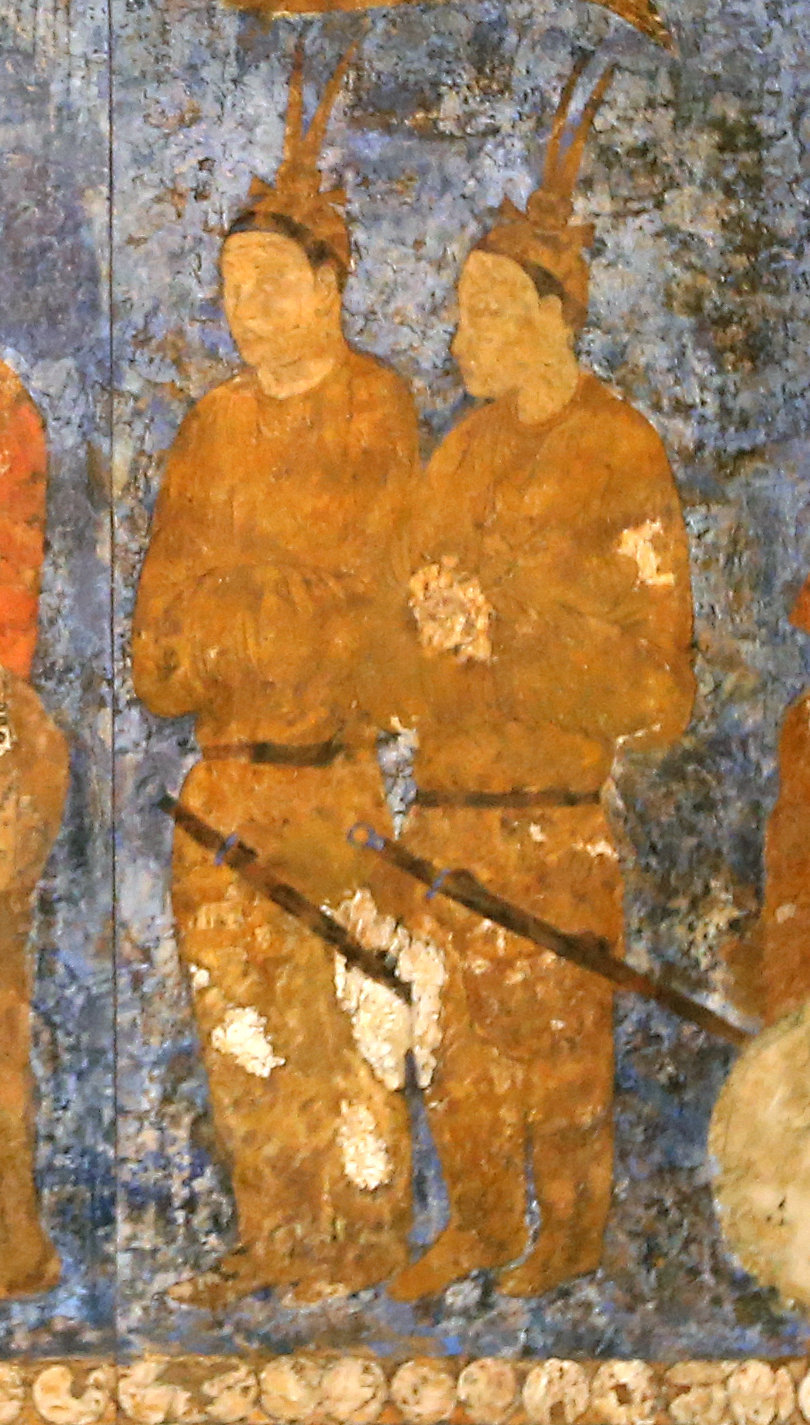
Goguryeo ambassadors during an audience with king Varkhuman of Samarkand. They are identified by the two feathers on top of their head. 648-651 CE, Afrasiyab, Samarkand.

=== Turkic period: Kara-Khanid Khanate (999-1212) ===
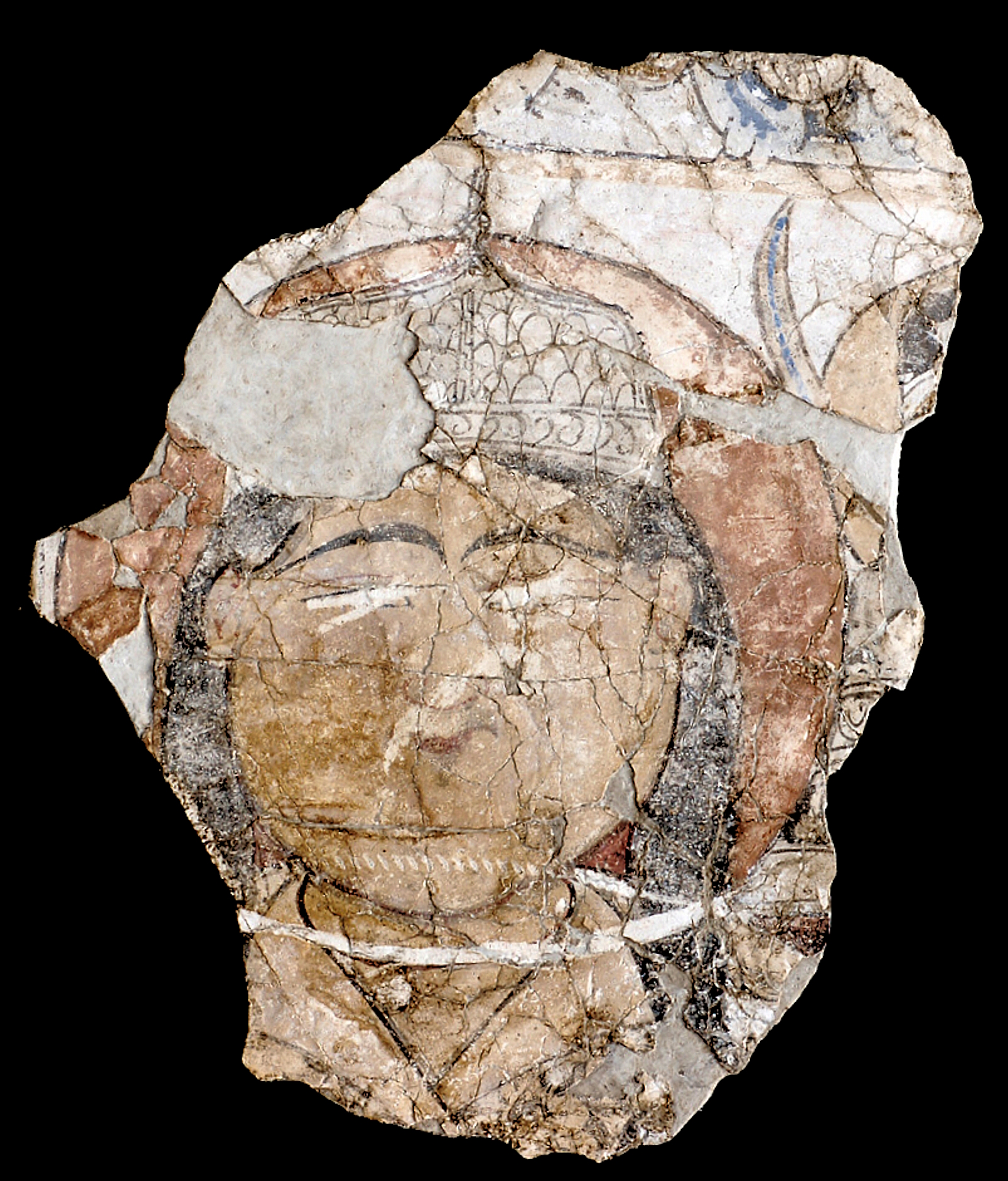
Detail of a Kara-Khanid ruler of Samarkand (sitting cross-legged on a throne in the complete reconstructed relief), Afrasiab, Samarkand, circa 1200 CE. It was possibly defaced in 1212 when the Khwarazmian Empire shah Muḥammad b. Tekish took over Samarkand.

A palatial structure dating to the Kara-Khanid Khanate (999–1212) was recently discovered in Afrasiab, complete with numerous decorative paintings dating to circa 1200. This period of artistic florescence would end in 1212, when the Kara-Khanids in Samarkand were conquered by the Kwarazmians. Soon however, Khwarezmia was invaded by the early Mongol Empire and its ruler Genghis Khan destroyed the once vibrant cities of Bukhara and Samarkand. However, in 1370, Samarkand saw a revival as the capital of the Timurid Empire.

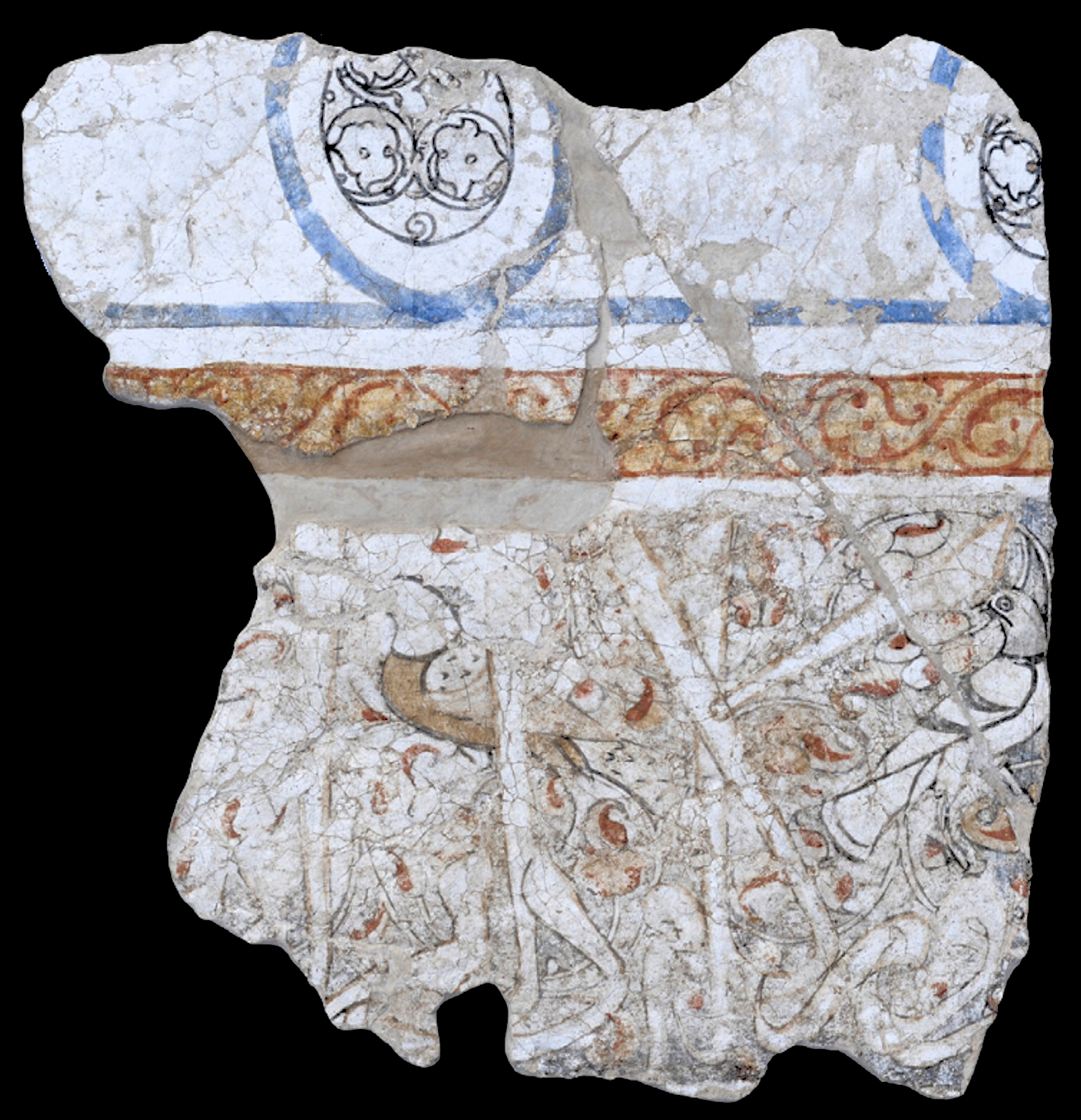
Kara-Khanid band of inscription containing a fragment of poetry reading kām-i dil, Afrasiab, Samarkand, circa 1200 CE.

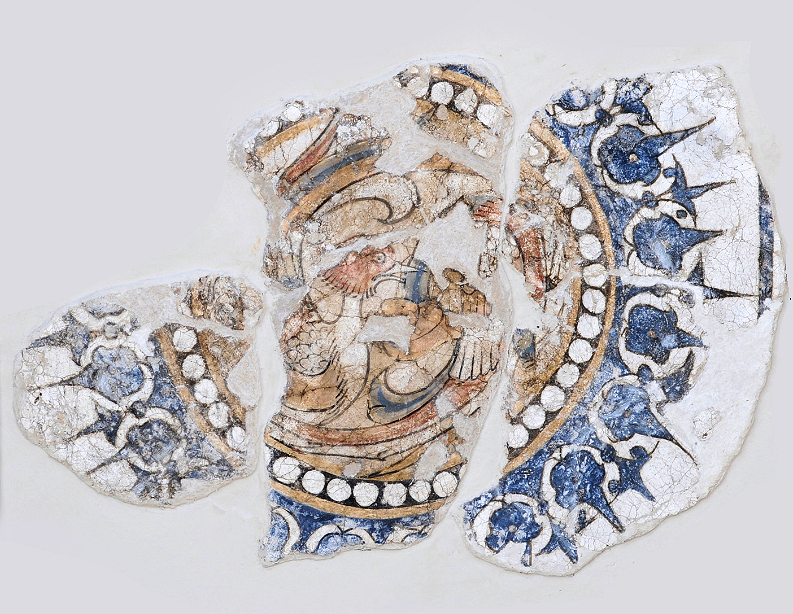
Kara-Khanid medallion with fighting birds, Afrasiab, circa 1200 CE.

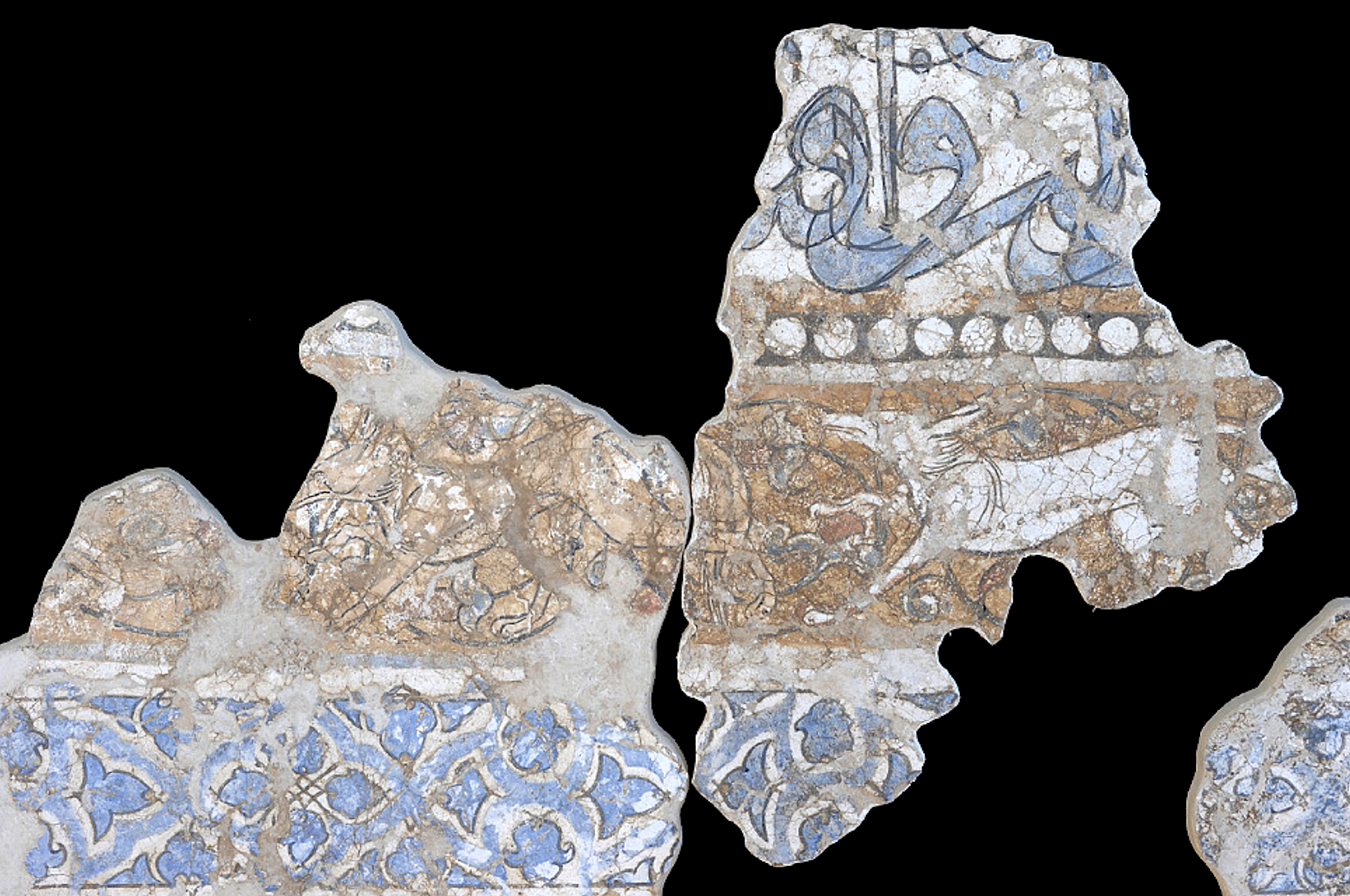
Kara-Khanid bands of inscription with running animals, Afrasiab, circa 1200 CE.

== See also ==
- Penjikent murals
- Sogdian art

== Sources ==
- Marshak, Boris; Grenet, Frantz; Sadowska-Daguin, Malgoržata (1994). "Le programme iconographique des peintures de la "Salle des ambassadeurs" à Afrasiab (Samarkand)". Arts Asiatiques. 49 (1): 5–20. doi:10.3406/arasi.1994.1349.
