= Ashina Huseluo =

- Jiwangjue Qaghan (繼往絕可汗); Jiezhongshizhu Qaghan (竭忠事主可汗)
- Reign: 693–704
- Predecessor: Ashina Duzhi (claimant to Western Turkic Khaganate); Ashina Yuanqing (client qaghan)
- Successor: Ashina Huaidao
- Died: 704; Chang'an, Wu Zhou dynasty
- Issue: Ashina Huaidao
Names
- Ashina Huseluo (阿史那斛瑟羅)
- House: Ashina
- Dynasty: Western Turkic Khaganate
- Father: Ashina Buzhen
- Religion: Tengrism

Ashina Huseluo or Ashina Kushrak (Chinese: 阿史那斛瑟羅; r. 693–704), also known as Böri (步利), was a puppet qaghan of the Western Turkic Khaganate, installed by the Wu Zhou dynasty.

== Life ==
Ashina Huseluo was the son of Ashina Buzhen who died in 667. His real name was Böri and his title was shad, hence Böri-shad (歩利設). As a youth he saw Tang influence decline in favor of the Tibetan Empire in Central Asia, thus he couldn't rule his ancestral lands and tribes. However, in 685 Wu Zetian made him Jiwangjue Qaghan and Protector-General of Mengchi to strengthen Tang rule in the west. Later he was appointed Xingxiwang Qaghan (Chinese: 興昔亡可汗; lit. 'The khagan who makes fallen to rise again') .

In 690, he was made Jiezhong Shizhu Qaghan (Chinese: 竭忠事主可汗; lit. 'Khagan who devoted his loyalty to his emperor') for his valiant fights against the Tibetan Empire and the Second Turkic Khaganate. Reportedly he was harsh and ruthless towards his subjects.

After Ashina Tuizi's rebellion he was sent again to Suyab in 700, as the Commander-in-Chief of the Expeditionary Pingxi Force (平西軍大総管). However, after the rise of Üç Elig Khagan (chief of Turgesh), he did not dare to come back to the Western Region.

He died in 704, in Chang'an and was succeeded by Ashina Huaidao.

== Source ==
- Old Book of Tang / Volume 194
