= Ashina Huaidao =

- Shixing Qaghan (十姓可汗); Jiwangjue Qaghan (繼往絕可汗)
- Reign: 704–708
- Predecessor: Ashina Huseluo
- Successor: Ashina Xian
- Died: 708
Names
- Ashina Huaidao (阿史那懷道)
- House: Ashina
- Dynasty: Western Turkic Khaganate
- Father: Ashina Huseluo

Ashina Huaidao (Chinese: 阿史那懷道; r. 704–708) was a qaghan of the Western Turkic Khaganate, installed by the Tang dynasty.

== Life ==
Ashina Huaidao was a son of Ashina Huseluo. In 706 he was sent to the Türgesh leader Sakal by the Tang to negotiate their submission. After achieving this, he was appointed as Shixing Khagan by Emperor Zhongzong who also appointed Sakal as the Dujun (Commander-in-chief) of the Walu Prefecture (嗢鹿州都督) and the Huaide Commandery Prince (懷徳郡王). However, he soon died and was buried in Xianyang.

== Family ==
Huaidao's wife was from the An family of the Six Sogdian Prefecture (六胡州) with whom he had several children:

- Ashina Xin - Jiwangjue Khagan (740–742)
- Princess Jiaohe - was married to Shatuo Fuguo (7th generation ancestor of Li Keyong)
- Princess Jinhe - was married to Suluk

== Sources ==
- New Book of Tang, Volume 215
