= Battle of Irtysh River =

Military engagement

- Part of Tang campaign against the Western Turks
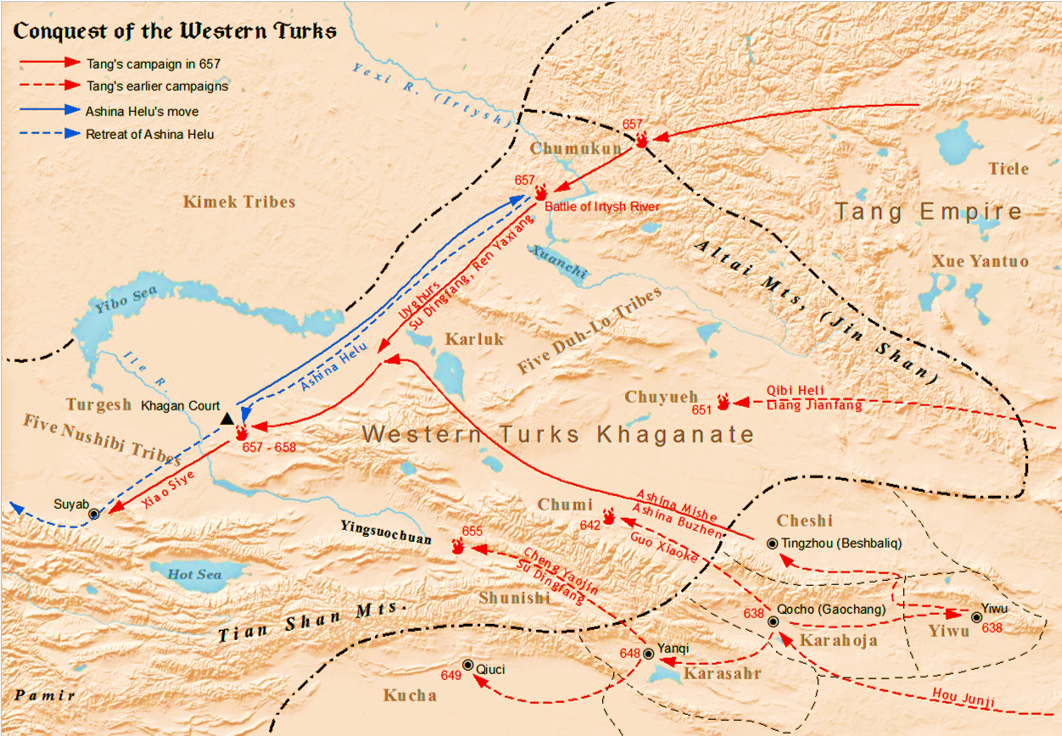
Date	657
Location	Irtysh River
Result	Tang victory

Belligerents
Tang dynasty Former vassals of the Western Turks	Western Turkic Khaganate

Commanders and leaders
Su Dingfang; Ren Yaxiang; Ashina Mishe; Ashina Buzhen; Xiao Siye	Ashina Helu

Strength
Unknown number main Tang army+10,000 Tang and Uyghur troops	100,000 troops

The Battle of Irtysh River (Chinese: 額爾齊斯河之戰) or Battle of Yexi River (Chinese: 曳咥河大戰) took place in 657 between the Tang dynasty and the Western Turkic Khaganate during the Tang campaign against the Western Turks. The Tang forces were led by general Su Dingfang while the Western Turkic army was led by their qaghan, Ashina Helu. It was fought along the Irtysh (Yexi) River near the Altai Mountains. Su Dingfang sent a detachment of 10,000 Tang and allied Uyghur cavalry to lure Helu's forces into an ambush. As the Tang-Uyghur cavalry retreated, the Western Turkic army gave chase and was lured into a two pronged attack by a formation of densely packed Tang infantry wielding long spears and a cavalry force led by Su. Helu's forces charged the Tang infantry formation three times but failed to break through and was routed by the Tang cavalry, suffering tens of thousands of casualties. The next day, tribes subordinate to Helu surrendered to the Tang while Helu escaped with several hundred horsemen to Chach (Tashkent). The Tang forces gave chase, defeated Helu's forces again, and captured him.

Helu's defeat ended the Western Turkic Khaganate, strengthened Tang control of Xinjiang, and led to Tang suzerainty over the Western Turks.
