= Varkhuman =

Varkhuman Varkhūmān Ūnash
- Ikhshid of Samarkand
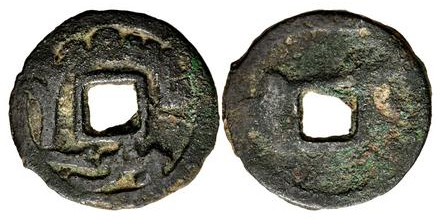
- Coinage of Varkhuman. Circa CE 650-675.
- Reign: Circa 650-670 CE
- Predecessor: Shishpin
- Successor: Urk Wartramuk
- Born: Samarkand, Sogdia
- Dynasty: Ikhshids
- Religion: Zoroastrianism

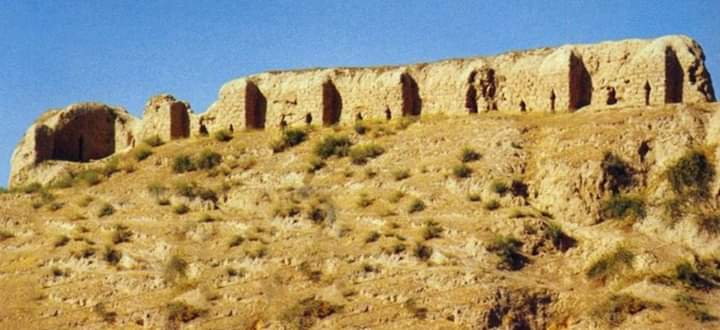
Crenellated wall portion of the ruins of Afrasiyab, Samarkand.

Varkhuman, also Vargoman (Chinese: 拂呼縵; pinyin: Fúhūmàn, c. 640-670 CE) was an Ikhshid (King) of Sogdia, residing in the city of Samarkand in the 7th century CE. He succeeded King Shishpin. He is known from the Afrasiab murals of Afrasiyab in Samarkand, where he is seen being visited by embassies from numerous countries, including China. There is also an inscription in the murals directly mentioning him. His name is also known from Chinese histories.

One of the murals show a Chinese Embassy carrying silk and a string of silkworm cocoons to the local Sogdian ruler. The scene depicted in the Afrasiyab murals probably occurred soon after 658 CE, when the Tang dynasty had conquered the Western Turkic Khaganate.

Varkhuman was a nominal vassal to the Chinese. He is mentioned in the Chinese annals:

During the Yonghui (永徽) era (650-655 CE), emperor Gaozong made this territory the Government of Kangju, and gave the title of Governor to the King of the country, Varkhuman (拂呼缦, Fúhūmàn).

— Chinese annals on Varkhuman.

Varkhuman's legacy was short-lived, as his palace was destroyed by the Arab general Sa'id ibn Uthman between 675 and 677 CE. At that time, according to Narshakhi there was no king of Samarkand anymore.

== Inscription mentioning Varhuman ==
In the murals of Afrasiab, an inscription mentioning Varhuman has been found. It is written in Sogdian:

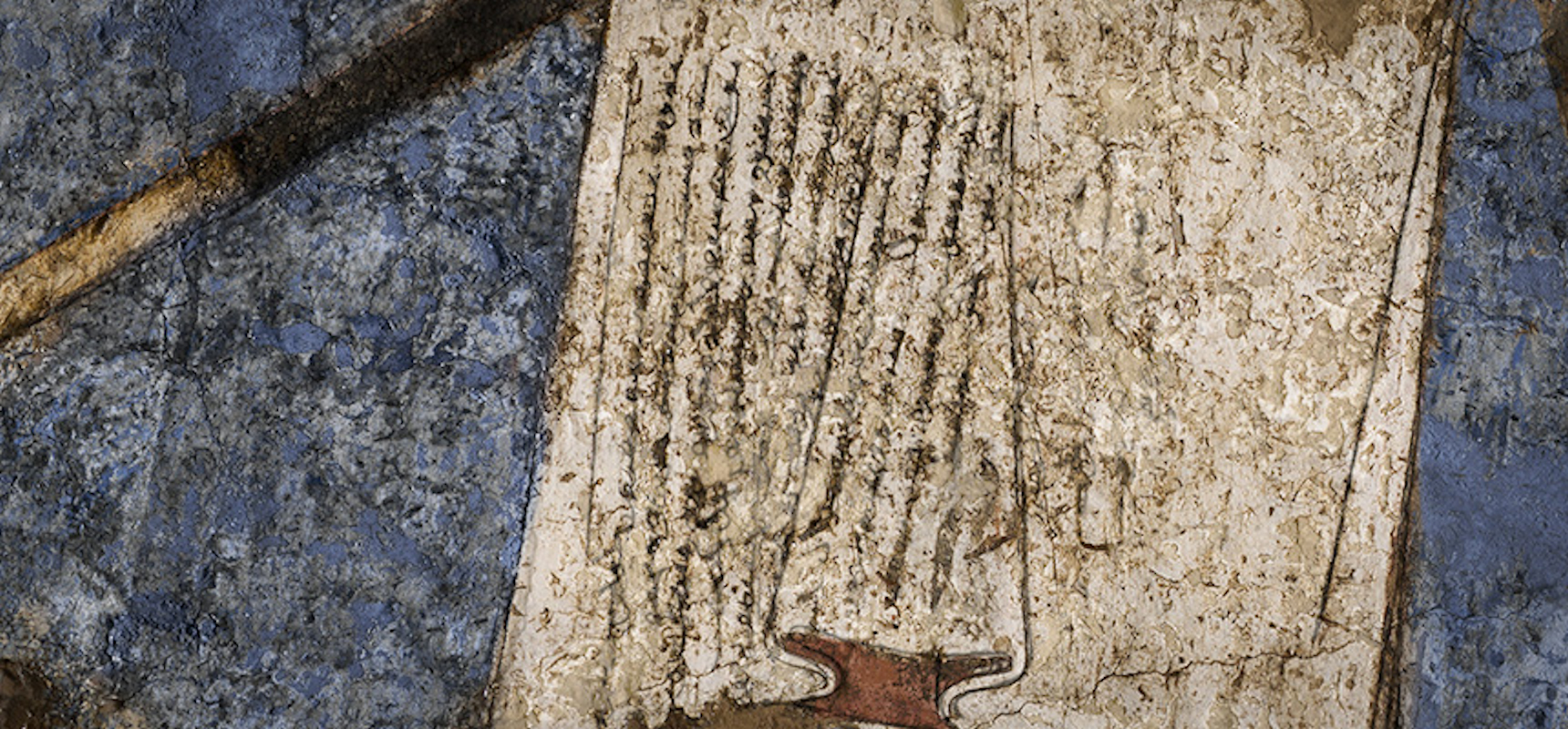
Afrasiab Sogdian inscription

When King Varkhuman Unash came to him [the ambassador] opened his mouth [and said thus]: "I am Pukarzate, the dapirpat (chancellor) of Chaganian. I arrived here from Turantash, the lord of Chaganian, to Samarkand, to the king, and with respect [to] the king [now] I am [here]. And with regard to me do not have any misgivings: About the gods of Samarkand, as well as about the writing of Samarkand I am keenly aware, and I also have not done any harm to the king. Let you be quite fortunate!" And King Varkhuman Unash took leave [of him]. And [then] the dapirpat (chancellor) of Chach opened his mouth.

— Inscription on an ambassador's robe.

== Afrasiab murals ==
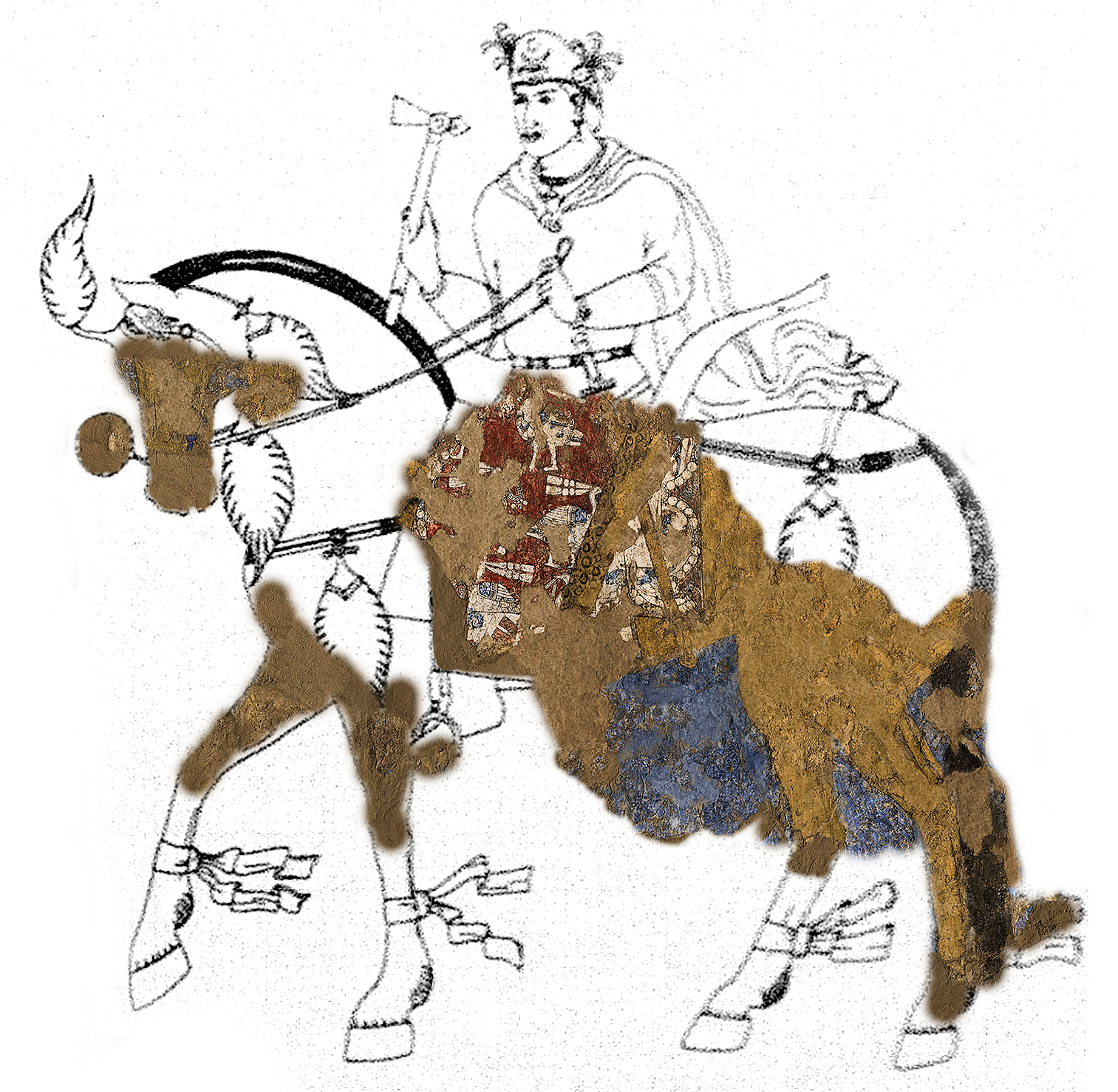
King Varkhuman on horse, Afrasiab remaining parts and reconstitution.

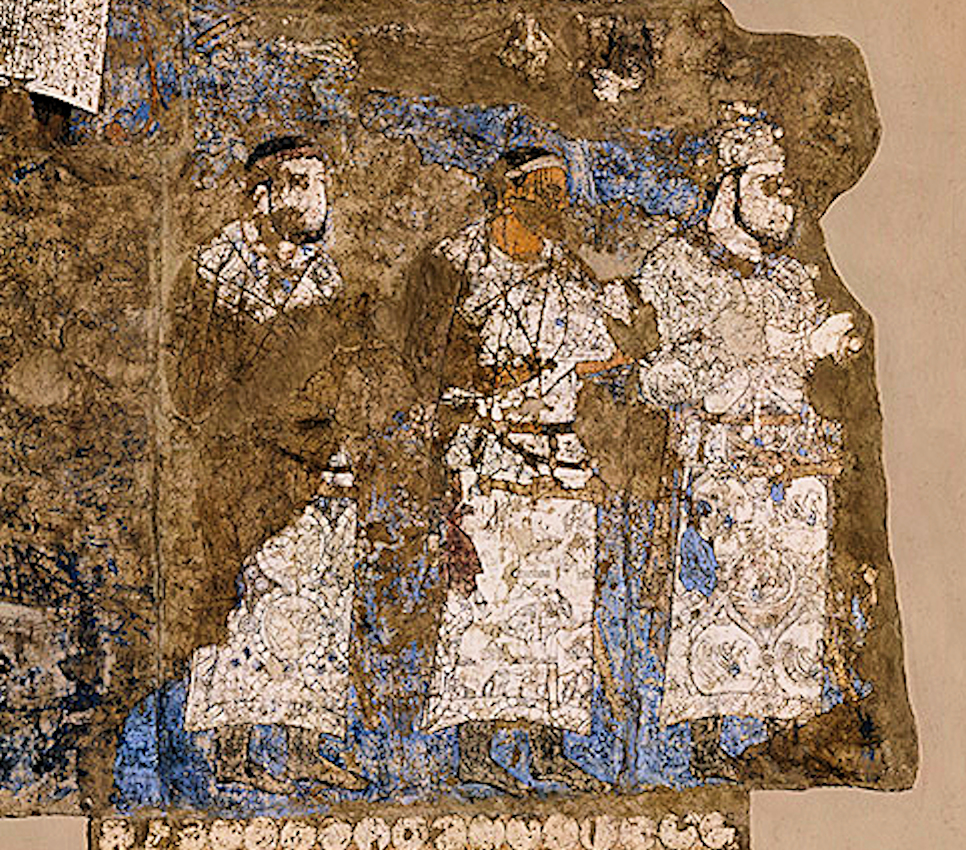
Ambassadors from Chaganian (central figure, inscription of the neck), and Chach (modern Tashkent) to king Varkhuman of Samarkand. 648-651 CE, Afrasiyab murals, Samarkand.

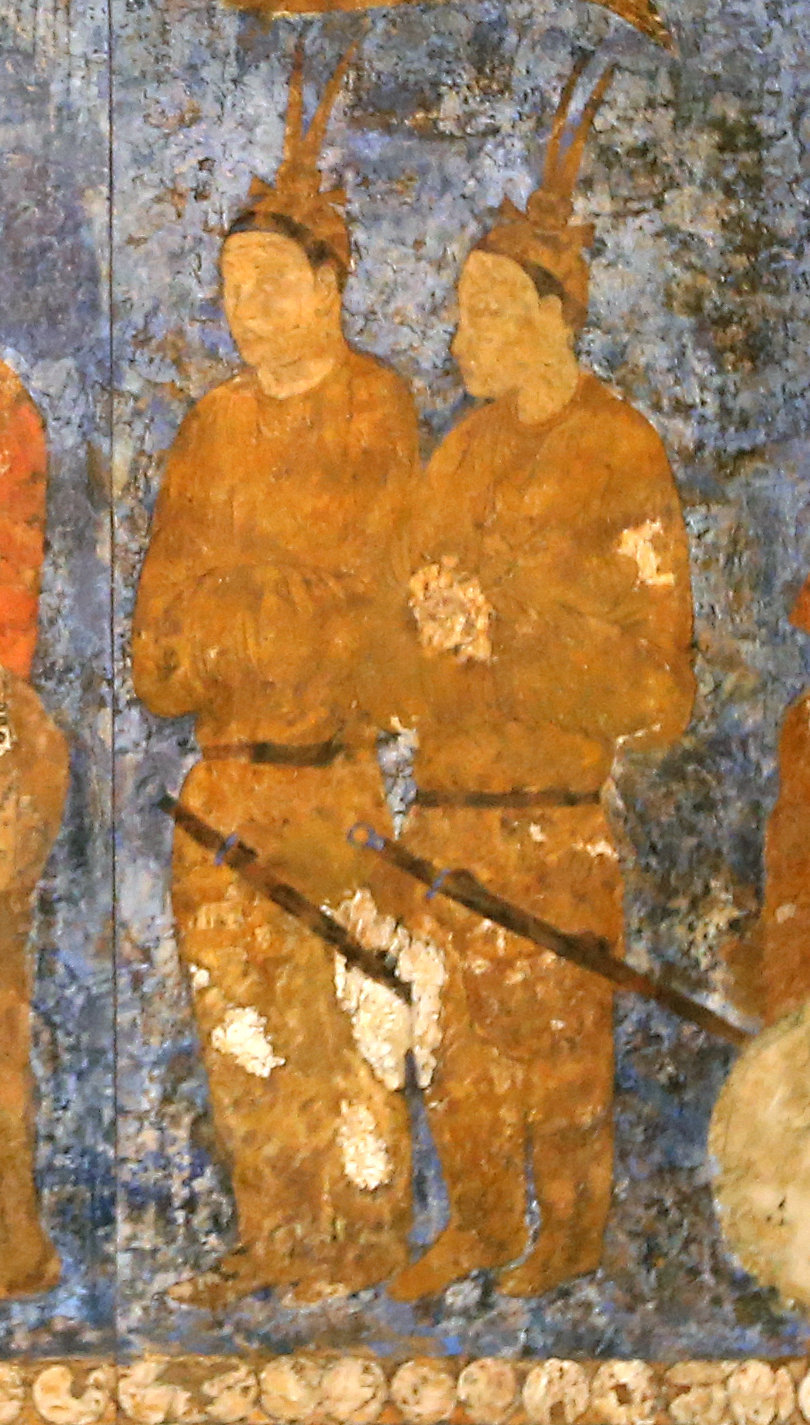
Goguryeo ambassadors during an audience with king Varkhuman of Samarkand. They are identified by the two feathers on top of their head. 648-651 CE, Afrasiyab, Samarkand.

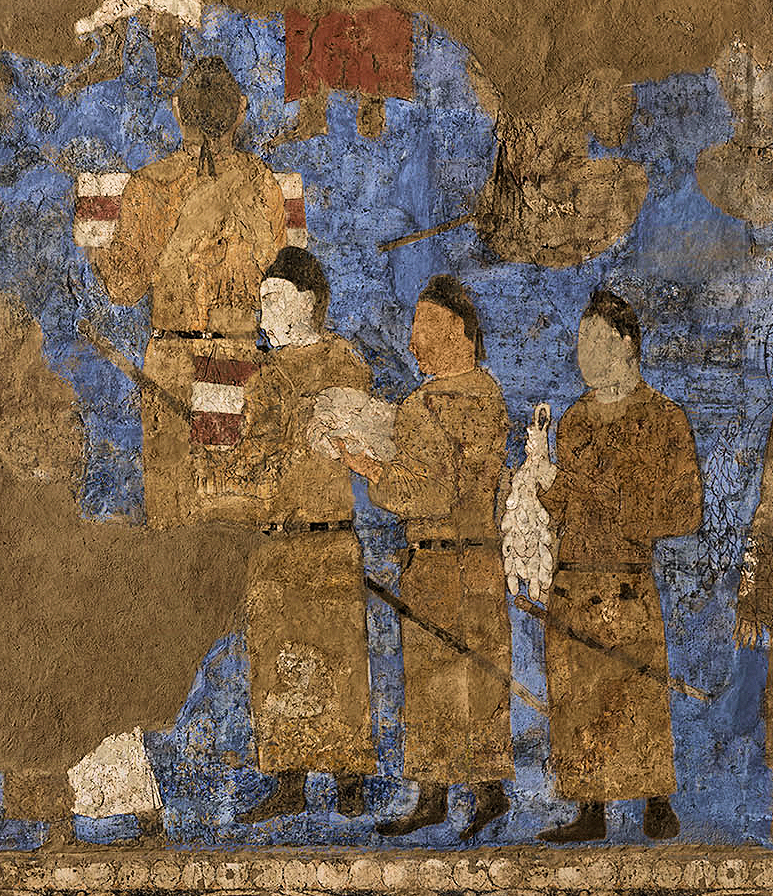
Tang dynasty emissaries at the court of Varkhuman in Samarkand carrying silk and a string of silkworm cocoons, 648-651 CE, Afrasiyab murals, Samarkand
