= Ashina Tuizi =

- Shixing Qaghan (十姓可汗)

Qaghan of the Western Turkic Khaganate
- Reign: 693–700
- Predecessor: Ashina Duzhi (claimant to Western Turkic Khaganate); Ashina Yuanqing (client qaghan)
- Successor: Ashina Puluo (阿史那仆羅)
Names
- Ashina Tuizi (阿史那俀子)
- House: Ashina
- Dynasty: Western Turkic Khaganate
- Father: Ashina Yuanqing
- Religion: Tengrism

Ashina Tuizi (Chinese: 阿史那俀子; r. 693–700) was a puppet qaghan of the Western Turkic Khaganate, installed by the Tibetan Empire.

== Life ==
Ashina Tuizi escaped the Tang dynasty after the execution of his father at the hands of Lai Junchen. After arriving in the Tibetan Empire in 693, he claimed the Western Turkic Khaganate with regnal title Tong Yabgu Khagan. He was soon joined by his uncles Ashina Babu (阿史那拔布) and Ashina Puluo (阿史那仆羅).

In 694, combined forces of Tong Yabgu and Tibetan general Gar Tsenyen Gungton ("Bolun Zanren" (勃論贊刃) in Chinese) suffered a defeat near Qinghai Lake against Wang Xiaojie. Later that year Tridu Songtsen and Tong Yabgu attacked Lengchen and raided several cities.

According to the Old Tibetan Annals, he was sent to the Göktürks in 700. Some think he was sent as a reinforcement for Axiji Baolu (阿悉吉薄露), who was thought to be of Western Turkic origin and who started a rebellion against the Tang. Some think he was sent to the Second Turkic Khaganate as a messenger of the united front with the Tibetan Empire.

In 705, he again allied with the Tibetan Empire and conquered the Fergana Valley. In 706, Tang army was driven off.
