= Ashina Buzhen =

- Jiwangjue Khagan (繼往絕可汗)
- Reign: 657–667
- Successor: Ashina Duzhi (claimant to Western Turkic Khaganate)
- Died: 667
- Burial: Zhao Mausoleum
- Issue: Ashina Huseluo
Names
- Ashina Buzhen (阿史那步真)
- House: Ashina
- Dynasty: Western Turkic Khaganate
- Father: Ashina She'er
- Religion: Tengrism

Ashina Buzhen (Chinese: 阿史那步真) was a khagan of the Western Turkic Khaganate appointed by Emperor Gaozong of the Tang dynasty after its conquest of the Western Turks. His fierce rivalry with his cousin, Ashina Mishe, was instrumental in driving the Western Turks away from the Tang dynasty and into allegiance with the Tibetan Empire.

== Life ==
Buzhen was a member of the ruling caste of the Western Turks. According to modern Turkish historian Ahmet Taşağıl, he was a descendant of Istämi. He was identified as a son of Ashina She'er by Ng Pak-sheung. After the Western Turks were conquered by the Chinese Tang dynasty his younger cousin Mishe was made khagan in 632. Angered by this, Buzhen attacked Mishe in 639 and killed 20 people including several of Mishe's brothers and nephews. Consequently, Mishe submitted to the Tang. Buzhen declared himself Yabghu (khagan) of the Duolu but was not accepted by the Duolu. Having lost prestige, he too submitted to the Tang.

Buzhen participated in the Goguryeo–Tang War in 645 and the Battle of Irtysh River where Tang armies defeated Ashina Helu. In 657 he was appointed Jiwangjue Khagan (Chinese: 继往绝可汗; pinyin: Jìwǎngjuékèhán; lit. 'The khagan who continued what ended') by Emperor Gaozong to rule over five Western Turkic tribes. In 659 he participated in a campaign alongside Mishe against rival claimant to the title of khagan, Zhenzhu Yabgu, near Shuanghe. in 662 Gaozong sent the general Su Haizheng (蘇海政) to attack Qiuzi and ordered Buzhen and Mishe to assist him. Buzhen, continuing his rivalry with Mishe, falsely informed Su that Mishe was preparing to rebel and would attack the Tang army; Su responded by ambushing Mishe, killing him and his chief assistants. Shunishi chief Chupan (鼠尼施處半啜) and Basaigan chief Tong Ishbara (拔塞幹暾沙鉢俟斤), angry over Ashina Mishe's death, turned away from the Tang and submitted to the Tibetan Empire instead. When Buzhen died in 667, Tang influence in the region was greatly reduced.

== Sources ==
- Old Book of Tang - Tujue Biographies (旧唐书·突厥传)
- Zizhi Tongjian / Volume 200
