= Ashina Yuanqing =

- Xingxiwang Qaghan (興昔亡可汗)
- Reign: 685–692
- Predecessor: Ashina Duzhi (claimant to Western Turkic Khaganate)
- Successor: Ashina Huseluo
- Died: 692; Chang'an, Wu Zhou dynasty
- Issue: Ashina Tuizi; Ashina Xian
Names
- Ashina Yuanqing (阿史那元慶)
- House: Ashina
- Dynasty: Western Turkic Khaganate
- Father: Ashina Mishe

Ashina Yuanqing (Chinese: 阿史那元慶; r. 685–692) was a puppet qaghan of the Western Turkic Khaganate, subordinate to the Tang and Wu Zhou dynasties.

== Biography ==
Ashina Yuanqing was a son of Ashina Mishe. He was made commander of Kunling General-Protectorate and Xingxiwang Khagan by Wu Zetian, being assigned to his father's tribes. However, his lands were soon invaded by the Tibetan Empire and he was captured and held hostage by Tibetans from 686 to 689. Although he was released and went to the Tang, he was falsely accused by Lai Junchen and executed by waist chopping, in 692 in Chang'an.

== Family ==
He had two sons:

- Ashina Tuizi - Rebelled, allied to the Tibetan Empire, then submitted to the Second Turkic Khaganate.
- Ashina Xian - Xingxiwang Khagan (708–717)
