= Ashina Duzhi =

- On Oq Qaghan (十姓可汗)

Qaghan of the Western Turkic Khaganate
- Reign: 676–679
- Predecessor: Ashina Mishe (as Xingxiwang Khagan); Ashina Buzhen (as Jiwangjue Khagan)
- Successor: Ashina Yuanqing (as Xingxiwang Khagan); Ashina Kushrak (as Jiwangjue Khagan)
- Died: 679; Chang'an, Tang dynasty
Names
- Ashina Duzhi (阿史那都支)
- House: Ashina
- Dynasty: Western Turkic Khaganate
- Religion: Tengrism

Ashina Duzhi (Chinese: 阿史那都支; r. 676–676) was a qaghan of the Western Turkic Khaganate following its conquest by the Tang dynasty. He took the throne with the support of the Tibetan Empire.

== Life ==
Duzhi's connection to other members of Ashina dynasty is unknown. He was appointed commander of the Fuyan (匐延) area by Emperor Gaozong of Tang in 671, which was mostly populated by Chumukun (処木昆部) tribes. However, in 676 he proclaimed himself On Oq Qaghan or Shixing Khagan (Chinese: 十姓可汗; lit. 'Khagan of Ten Tribes'), entered alliance with Tibetans and invaded the Anxi Protectorate.

The Tang retaliated and sent Pei Xingjian. Duzhi's first act was to ask to escort the successor to the Persian throne, Narsieh to the Western Turk homeland. Duzhi himself arrived to escort only to be captured by Pei and sent to Changan.

Duzhi was replaced by Wang Fangyi (王方翼). Narsieh was appointed to rule a castle formerly belonging to Duzhi.
