= Ashina Mishe =

Xilibi Duolu Qaghan
- Xingxiwang Qaghan (興昔亡可汗)
- Reign: 657–662
- Successor: Ashina Duzhi (claimant to Western Turkic Khaganate)
- Died: 662
- Issue: Ashina Yuanqing
Names
- Ashina Mishe (阿史那彌射)
Regnal name
- Xilibi Duolu Qaghan (奚利邲咄陸可汗)
- House: Ashina
- Dynasty: Western Turkic Khaganate
- Father: Böri Shad

Ashina Mishe (Chinese: 阿史那彌射; ?–662), regnal name Xilibi Duolu Qaghan (奚利邲咄陸可汗), was a puppet qaghan of the Western Turkic Khaganate, installed by Emperor Gaozong of the Tang dynasty. Xue Zongzheng suggested he and Duolu Qaghan were the same person.

== Biography ==
=== Early life ===
Mishe was titled Baghatur Yabgu (Chinese: 莫賀咄葉護; pinyin: Mòhèduō Yèhù) before 632. In 632, the Tang dynasty sent official Liu Shanyin (劉善因) to make him Xilibi Duolu Qaghan (奚利邲咄陸可汗). However, he was on bad terms with his elder cousin Ashina Buzhen who wanted to take his lands and people. In order to escape his machinations, he submitted to the Tang in 639 with his subordinate tribes Chuyue and Chumi. He was soon made a general and took part in Goguryeo–Tang War in 645, for which Taizong awarded him with title Count of Pingrang (Pyongyang) (平壤县伯).

=== Later life ===
After Su Dingfang's conquest of Western Turks, he was made Xingxiwang Khagan (Chinese: 興昔亡可汗; lit. 'The khagan who makes the fallen rise again') and the Protectorate General to Pacify the West was divided in half, with the Kunling Protectorate and Tulu tribes being awarded to Mishe. However, in 662 Emperor Gaozong sent the general Su Haizheng (蘇海政) to attack Qiuzi and ordered Ashina Mishe and Ashina Buzhen to assist him. Ashina Buzhen, falsely informed Su that Ashina Mishe was set to rebel and would attack the Tang army, and Su responded by ambushing Ashina Mishe, killing him and his chief assistants. Shunishi chief Chupan (鼠尼施處半啜) and Basaigan chief Tong Ishbara (拔塞幹暾沙鉢俟斤) angry over Ashina Mishe's death, largely turned away from the Tang and submitted to the Tibetan Empire instead, and when Ashina Buzhen died later that year, Tang influence in the region was greatly reduced.

== Family ==
Mishe had at least three issues:

- Ashina Yuanqing
- Ashina Babu – submitted to Tibetan Empire, joined Ashina Tuizi
- Ashina Poluo – submitted to Tibetan Empire, joined Ashina Tuizi
