= Tang campaign against Kucha =

Tang dynasty conquest

- Part of the Tang campaign against the oasis states
- A map of the campaigns against the oasis states of the Tarim Basin, including the defeat of Kucha
Date	648 – 19 January 649
Location	Tarim Basin
Result	Tang victory: Tang military garrison installed in Kucha; Tang establishes control over the northern Tarim Basin

Belligerents
Tang dynasty	Kucha; Western Turkic Khaganate

Commanders and leaders
Emperor Taizong of Tang; Ashina She'er; Qibi Heli; Guo Xiaoke †	Haripushpa (POW); Nali †

Strength
100,000 Tiele horsemen Unknown number of Tang infantry	50,000 Kucha soldiers ~10,000 Turkic reinforcements

Casualties and losses
2,000	12,000 killed, tens of thousands captured

The Tang campaign against Kucha was led by the Tang dynasty general Ashina She'er against the Tarim Basin oasis state of Kucha in Xinjiang, which was aligned with the Western Turkic Khaganate. The campaign began in 648 and ended on 19 January 649, after the surrender of the Kuchan forces following a forty-day siege of Aksu. Kuchean soldiers tried to recapture the kingdom with the assistance of the Western Turkic Khaganate, but were defeated by the Tang army.

== Background ==
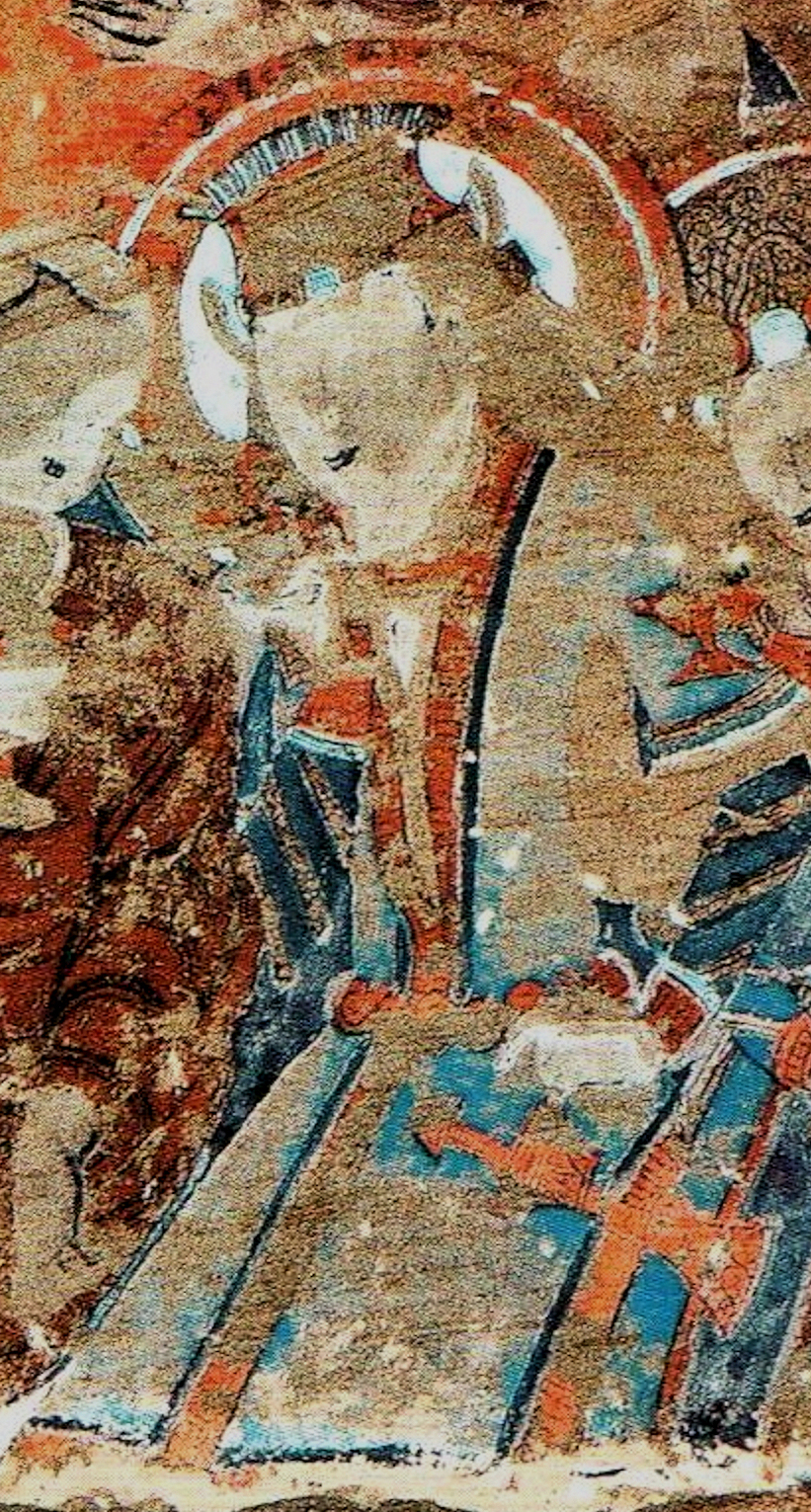
King Suvarnapuspa of Kucha (ruled 600–625), Cave 69, Kizil Caves.

Suvarnapushpa (Chinese: 苏伐勃𫘝 Sufaboshi), the king of Kucha, provided the Tang court with tribute in 618. In 630, Suvarnapushpa's successor Suvarnadeva (Chinese: Sufadie) submitted to the Tang as a vassal. A Buddhist of the Hinayana sect, Suvarnadeva had hosted the Buddhist monk Xuanzang when he arrived in Kucha during the same year. Kucha supported Karasahr when the oasis state made a marriage alliance with the Western Turks and ended its tributary relationship with the Tang court in 644. The king of Kucha, Suvarnadeva, renounced Tang suzerainty and also allied with the Western Turks. Emperor Taizong responded by dispatching a military campaign led by the general Guo Xiaoke against Karasahr.

The Tang army defeated Kucha, captured its king, and a pro-Tang member of the royal family was enthroned as ruler. The new king was deposed by the Western Turks soon afterwards, and the Western Turks regained suzerainty over Karasahr. Suvarnadeva died between 646 and 648, and his brother Haripushpa (Chinese: Helibushibi) inherited the throne as Kucha's king. Although Haripushpa sent two tribute embassies to the Tang court, Taizong had already decided to punish Kucha's pro-Turk stance by launching an expedition against the kingdom.

In 646 Irbis Seguy, ruler of the Western Turks, sought a Chinese princess for his bride. In return, Taizong asked for several Tarim Basin cities. When the proposal was refused, the Tang emperor used it as a pretext for war.

Most of the Tang expeditionary army was made up of 100,000 cavalry supplied by the Tang empire's Tiele allies. The commander-in-chief of the Tang expeditionary army, Ashina She'er, was a member of the Eastern Turkic Khaganate's ruling Ashina tribe. He joined the Tang forces after his surrender in 635, and served as a general leading a campaign against Gaochang. His familiarity with the region as a former Turkic ruler contributed to his success in the campaigns against Kucha and Karasahr. Prior to his recruitment as a Tang general, he reigned from 630 to 635, governing the city of Beshbalik in the Dzungarian Basin. Ashina She'er's deputy commanders were Qibi Heli (a Tiele chieftain who had also become a Tang general) and Guo Xiaoke.

== Campaign ==
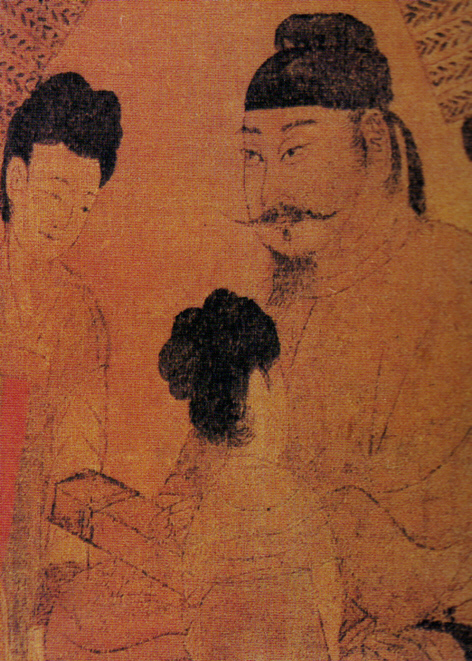
Emperor Taizong launched military campaigns against the oasis states of the Tarim Basin

Ashina She'er's soldiers were organized in five columns. The Tang army bypassed Karasahr and struck at Kucha from the north by moving through the Dzungarian Basin, which was the territory of the Chuyue (possibly Chigil) and Chumi, two Turkic tribes allied with the oasis state. The Tang army defeated the Chuyue and Chumi before entering the Tarim Basin.

The forces defending Kucha, consisting of 50,000 soldiers, were lured out of the city into the desert and ambushed by Ashina. They had chased after a group of 1,000 horsemen employed by She'er as a decoy, but encountered additional Tang forces that mounted a surprise attack. The Kuchean forces were defeated and retreated to Aksu, a nearby kingdom in the Tarim Basin. She'er captured the King following a forty-day siege, ending with the surrender of the Kucha forces on 19 January 649. One of She'er's officers, acting as a diplomat, persuaded the chieftains of the region to surrender instead of fighting back.

Guo Xiaoke, who had led the first Tang campaign against Karasahr in 644, was installed in Kucha as protector-general of the Anxi Protectorate. The headquarters of the protector-general was thus moved from its original location in Gaochang to Kucha. While She'er was in pursuit of the Kuchean king, Nali, a Kuchean lord, who traveled to request the help of the Western Turks. Guo was assassinated after the Kuchean soldiers retook the kingdom with the military assistance of the Western Turks. She'er returned to Kucha, captured five of the kingdom's cities, and forced the remaining cities to surrender. Tang control was re-established in the oasis state. The brother of the former king, a yabgu or viceroy, was enthroned by the Chinese as a subject of the Tang empire.

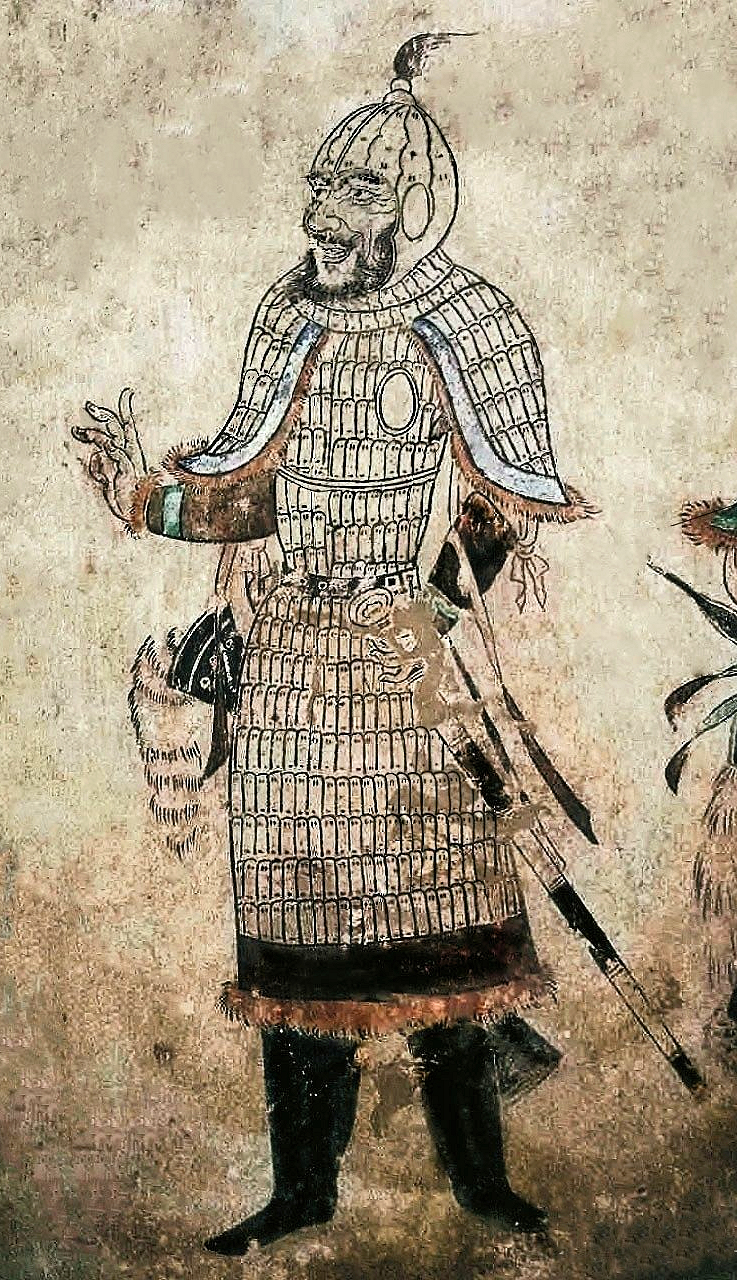
Chinese officer of the Guard of Honour. Tomb of Princess Chang-le (長樂公主墓), Zhao Mausoleum, Shaanxi province. Tang Zhenguan year 17, i.e. 644

The king of Kucha, Haripushpa, was taken to the Tang capital as a prisoner. Execution was the punishment of rebellion in accordance with Tang law but the King was pardoned by Taizong and released after a ritual venerating the Emperor's ancestors. He was also named Great Army Commander for the Militant Guards of the Left, a title he received from the Emperor. His brother was enthroned as king of Kucha but kept under strict supervision.

== Aftermath ==
In retribution for the death of Guo Xiaoke, Ashina She'er ordered the execution of eleven thousand Kuchean inhabitants by decapitation. It was recorded that "he destroyed five great towns and with them many myriads of men and women... the lands of the west were seized with terror." After Kucha's defeat, She'er dispatched a small force of light cavalry led by the lieutenant Xue Wanbei to Khotan, ruled by the king Yuchi Fushexin. The threat of an invasion convinced the King to visit the Tang court in person, after which he was sent home with titles and privileges.

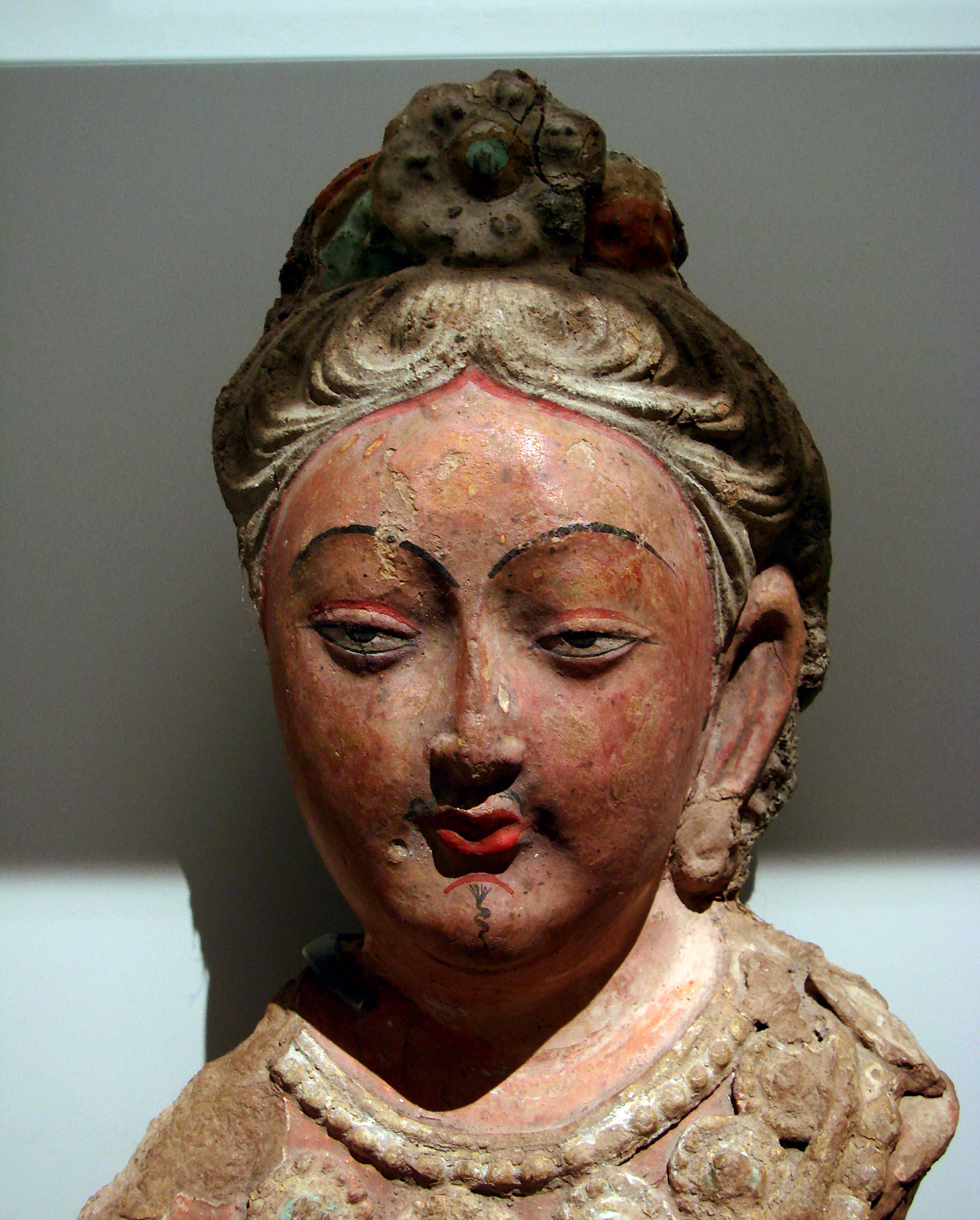
Bust of a bodhisattva from Kucha, 6th–7th century

It has long been claimed that the conquest of Kucha established Tang rule over the entire Tarim Basin. This is in part due to a number of inaccurate Chinese sources linking the expedition to the establishment of the Four Garrisons of Anxi, which comprised Kucha, Karasahr, Khotan, and Kashgar. However, Zhang Guangda has used excavated texts from Gaochang to show that the Tang abandoned the attempt to move the headquarters of the Anxi Protectorate to Kucha after Guo Xiaoke's assassination. Instead the headquarters returned to Gaochang until 658, when it was moved back to Kucha following a Tang army's suppression of a local pro-Turk revolt against Haripushpa (who died from an illness during the revolt).

It has also been claimed that the fall of Kucha led to the decline of Indo-European culture in the Tarim Basin and its replacement by first Chinese and then Turkic culture. Rather, the opposite is true. Kuchean culture flourished during the seventh and eighth centuries and Kuchean music was popular in the Tang capital, in part due to the movement of Kuchean musicians to the Tang court. The Turkicization of the Tarim Basin is a later development that came after the end of the Tang dynasty and had no relation to the earlier Tang protectorate in the Tarim Basin.

After 649, the Tang dynasty continued their war against the Western Turks under the reign of Emperor Gaozong, Taizong's successor. Gaozong conducted a campaign led by general Su Dingfang against Ashina Helu in 657. Ashina Helu surrendered, the Western Turks were defeated, and the khaganate's former territories were annexed by the Tang. The Tang retreated from beyond the Pamir Mountains in modern Tajikistan and Afghanistan after a Turkic revolt in 662, and lost the Tarim Basin to local revolts and Tibetan incursions in 665–670. The Tang regained the Tarim Basin in 692 and again lost it to the Tibetans in the 790s, the Four Garrisons having already been cut off from the rest of the Tang empire by a Tibetan conquest of the Hexi Corridor. Although the Tibetan empire collapsed in the middle of the ninth century, the Tang dynasty lacked the means to regain dominance in the Tarim Basin and itself ended in 907 with the abdication of Emperor Ai.

== See also ==
- Turks in the Tang military
