= Turks in the Tang military =

Overview of the use of Turkic troops in the Tang dynasty military

The military of the Tang dynasty was staffed with a large population of Turkic soldiers, referred to as Tujue (突厥) in Chinese sources. Tang elites in northern China were familiar with Turkic culture, a factor that contributed to the empire's acceptance of Turkic recruits. The Emperor Taizong of Tang adopted the title of "Heavenly Khagan" and promoted a cosmopolitan empire. Turkic soldiers that served under the Tang dynasty originated from the Eastern Turkic Khaganate. It began with Taizong who sent his general Li Jing, eventually ended in defeating the Eastern Turks and capturing their leader Jiali Khan.

Taizong regularly recruited and promoted military officers of Turkic ancestry, whose steppe experience contributed to the western and northern expansion of the Tang empire. The Turkic general Ashina She'er participated in the Tang capture of the Karakhoja, Karasahr, and Kucha kingdoms in Xinjiang. The half-Turkic general An Lushan started a revolt that led to the decline of the Tang dynasty.

The Orkhon inscriptions by the Gokturks were critical of the Turks that had served the Tang dynasty, and condemned them for helping the Tang emperor expand his burgeoning empire. The Turkic soldiers stationed in Tang garrisons of Central Asia settled in the region, spreading Turkic languages in the area.

== Background ==
The empire of the Tang dynasty was cosmopolitan and diverse. The Tang dynasty elites of northern China had an interest in Turkic culture and intermingled with the people of the steppes. The setting of one Tang poem describes a yurt, and the performance of a Turkic actress was hosted in the emperor's palace Following the Tang dynasty's defeat of the Eastern Turkic Khaganate, the government authorized the settlement of Turks along the borders of the Tang empire. Turkic officers of the former khaganate were recruited as generals in the Tang military, and their experience with steppe warfare contributed to the Tang's military successes as it expanded westward.

=== Emperor Taizong and multiculturalism ===
Emperor Taizong adopted the steppe title of Heavenly Kaghan.

Emperor Taizong, also known by his personal name Li Shimin, was familiar with the culture of the steppe nomads and employed military strategies using steppe tactics as a prince. Taizong was a skilled horseman, and during a celebration of his victory and ascension to the throne, sacrificed a horse in a ritual derived from a Turkic religious practice. He was able to outmaneuver the heavy cavalry of the Sui dynasty with his light cavalry, a characteristic of steppe warfare. Taizong shared personal relationships with Turkic allies as a prince, reinforced through oaths sworn as blood brothers. His later successes as an emperor against the armies of Central Asia through diplomacy and divide and rule are the result of his early experiences with Turkic culture.

Taizong's adoption of the Heavenly Kaghan title was used to legitimize his role as a steppe khan not solely as a Chinese emperor with the title of Son of Heaven. He valued the kaghan title and was sincere about his role as a leader of Central Asia. He sought to solidify his claim as a kaghan by organizing a gathering of Turkic leaders in the Lingzhou fortress during the last years of his reign to reconfirm his title.

While mostly symbolic, the title of Heavenly Kaghan shows Taizong's open attitudes towards the existence of a multicultural and ethnically diverse Tang empire. Taizong was proud of his policies promoting ethnic equality, and was reported to have said that, "The emperors since ancient times have all appreciated the Chinese and depreciated the barbarians. Only I view them as equal. That is why they look upon me as their parent."

He had a paternalistic attitude towards his subjects and believed that it was his duty to treat the Chinese and foreign ethnic groups as equals under one ruler. Taizong's views grew into state policy as his government recruited Turkic and other non-Han Chinese soldiers into the Tang military. Turkic soldiers were later promoted to higher ranks as commanders and generals. The surname of Li, belonging to the royal family of Li Shimin, was awarded to Han and non-Han officers for their service.

Tang relationship with the Turks may have further deepened had the crown prince Li Chengqian, a Turkophile, been enthroned as Taizong's successor. Li Chengqian enthusiastically embraced Turkic customs, and Chinese historian Sima Guang recorded that he:

He [Li Chengqian] loved to emulate Turkish speech and their manner of dress. He chose from among his retinue those who had Turkish features and grouped them in bands of five; he made them plait their hair, wear sheepskins, and herd sheep. He had made five wolf's head banners and tents and set up yurts. The crown prince took up residence here; he gathered sheep and cooked them, and then, drawing out his waist-knife, he would carve the meat and let everyone eat.

Li Chengqian was deposed as crown prince by Taizong after his plans to usurp the throne were revealed. He was exiled by Taizong and died as a commoner.

== Turkic generals and Tang military campaigns ==
Map of Tang campaigns against the Tarim Basin oasis states. The Turkic general Ashina She'er led the campaigns against Karasahr and Kucha.

Turkic generals led many of the Tang dynasty military campaigns that expanded the dynasty's territorial reach into Central Asia. In total, ten Turks were able to reach the highest military position of general. Ashina She'er, formerly the ruler of Beshbaliq and Kharakhoja between 630 and 635 and a member of the Ashina clan, was recruited as a Tang general in 635. He fought as a commander in a successful campaign against Karakhoja in 640. She'er was chosen as the general for the military expedition against Karasahr. The Tang loyalist that had been installed as ruler after the first invasion of Karasahr in 644 by Chinese general Guo Xiaoke was deposed by his cousin in a revolt. The usurper was executed after the rebellion was suppressed, and Tang governance returned to the oasis state. She'er continued onward to the nearby kingdom of Kucha, a state that had supported Karasahr during its war against the Tang.

Emperor Taizong himself tended to the injuries of the Turkic Generals Qibi Heli and Ashina Simo, who were both wounded during the campaign against Goguryeo.

Ashina Zhong, a cousin of She'er, also served as a Turkic general of the Tang dynasty, and was a participant in a military performance hosted by Emperor Gaozong in 655. Another Turkic member of the Ashina clan, Ashina Helu, briefly served as a commander of the Tang army in Gansu before his rise as a kaghan of the Western Turkic Khaganate. During his reign, the Turkic tribes were unified under a single leader. Emperor Gaozong, Taizong's successor, dispatched a military expedition in 657 against Helu, who had been raiding Tang settlements. The campaign was led by the general Su Dingfang and the Turkic commanders Ashina Mishe and Ashina Buzhen, who were opposed to Helu. Helu was defeated and captured by the Tang forces, and the territories annexed from the Western Turks were placed under Tang governance through the Anxi Protectorate.

Gaozong awarded the military service of the Turkic commanders Mishe and Buzhen by appointing them as proxy rulers of ten Western Turkic tribes. The ten tribes were split between the two cousins, and the western half was given to Buzhen while Mishe controlled the eastern tribes. In 685, the sons of Mishe and Buzhen were sent from the Tang capital of Chang'an, where they resided, to succeed their fathers in the west. Neither lasted long as Turkic rulers; one was overthrown by his tribal subjects and the other was deposed by the Second Turkic Khaganate after an invasion in 690.

An Lushan was a Tang general of mixed Turkic and Soghdian ancestry whose revolt between 755 and 763, the An Shi Rebellion, devastated the Tang dynasty. Unlike the majority of Turkic military officers, An Lushan served the Tang as an official closely involved with the politics of the imperial court, rather than as a general in a garrison on the Tang frontier. The dynasty might have collapsed had it not been for their alliance with the Uyghur Turks. The rebellion diminished the Tang enthusiasm for cosmopolitanism that was a characteristic of the dynasty's earlier years.

The Orkhon inscriptions, a memorial erected by the Turks, lamented the Tang influence on the Turks and the Turkic adoption of Chinese titles:

The Turkish people let their state... go to ruin... their sons worthy of becoming lords became slaves, and their daughters worthy of becoming ladies became servants to the Chinese people. The Turkish lords abandoned their Turkish titles. Those lords who were in China held the Chinese titles and obeyed the Chinese emperor and gave their service to him for fifty years. For the benefit of the Chinese, they went on campaigns up to [the land of] the Bukli qaghan in the east, where the sun rises, and as far as the Iron Gate in the West. For the benefit of the Chinese emperor they conquered countries.

The inscriptions, made to commemorate the elites of the Second Turkic Empire, stress the importance of loyalty between a kaghan and the ruler's subjects. The Turks that sided with the Tang are condemned, and the disunity of the Turkic tribes is blamed on a lack of respect for the authority of the kaghan.

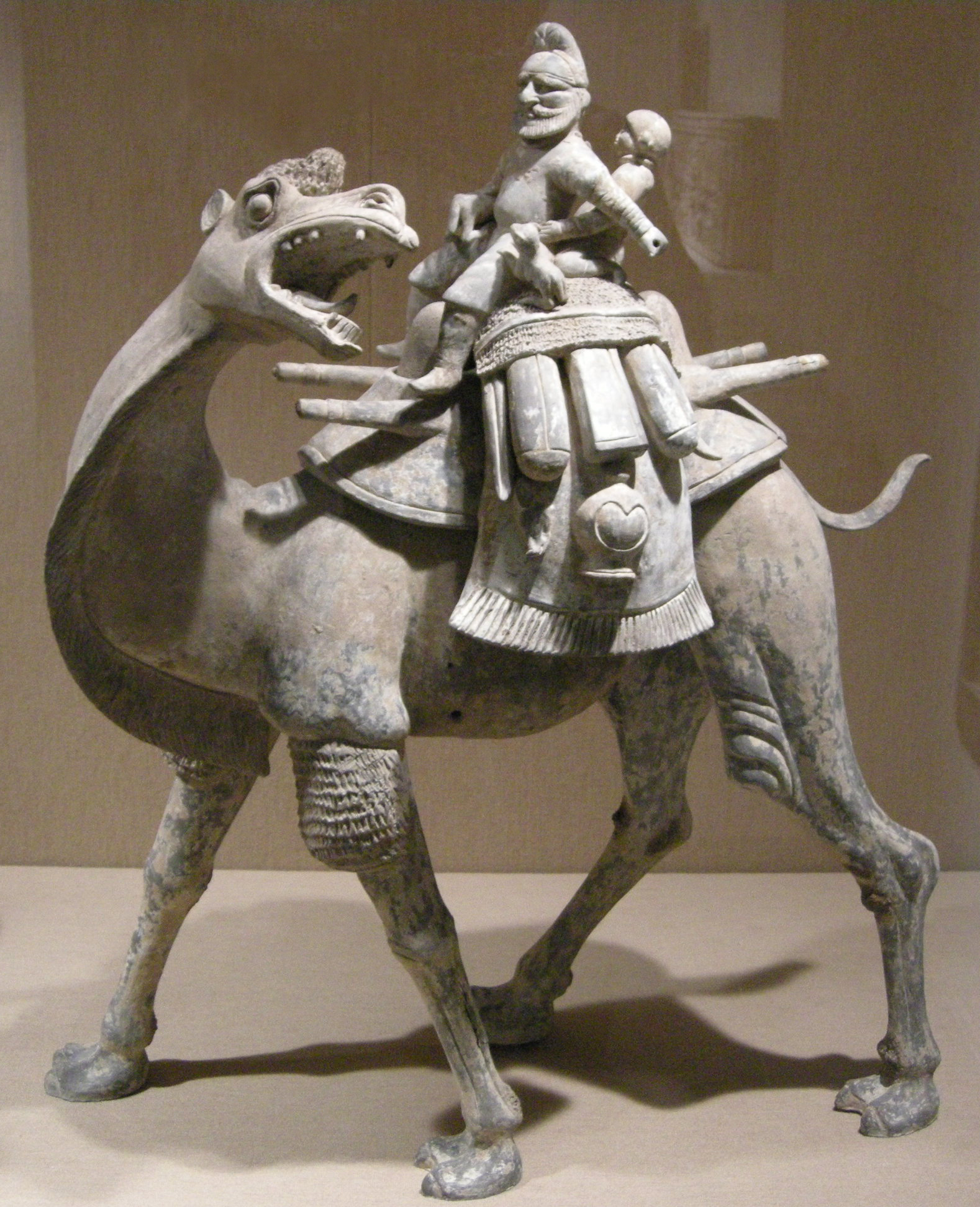
Camel with rider, earthenware, Tang dynasty

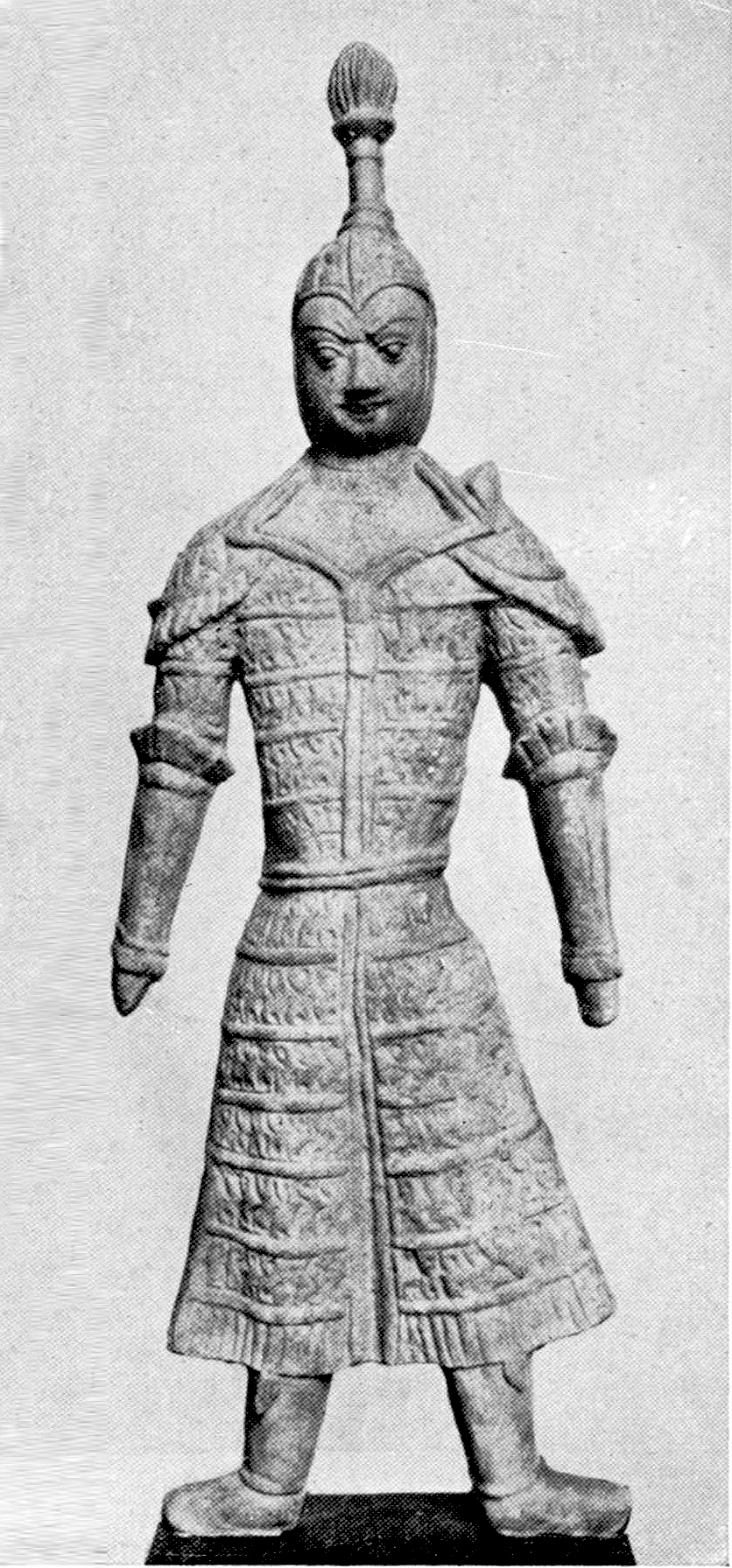
Statuette of an armoured Turkic soldier, 8th century

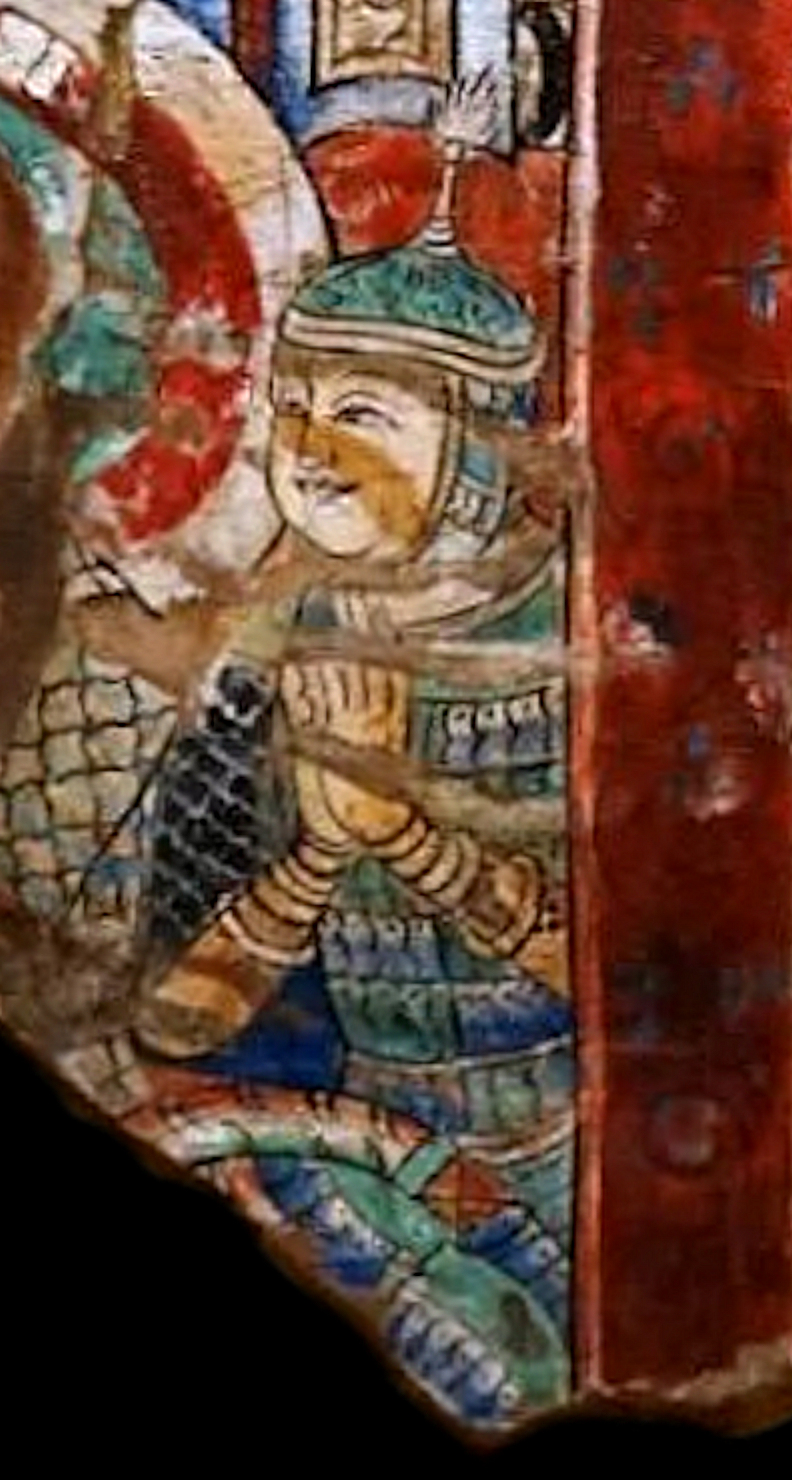
Turkic warrior in a mural from Tumxuk

== Historical significance ==
The Turkic soldiers and generals that worked in the Tang garrisons of Central Asia spurred Turkic migration into the area. The Turkic language and culture of the Tang soldiers there gradually displaced the indigenous Indo-European languages. The native languages of Sogdian and Tokharian disappeared as the Turkic languages spread in the Tarim Basin.

The Tang dynasty declined after the An–Shi Rebellion and eventually fell in 907. During the subsequent Five Dynasties and Ten Kingdoms period, several of the dynasties were ruled by families of Turkic ancestry. The Shatuo Turks founded the Later Tang in 923, the Later Jin in 936, the Later Han in 947, and the Northern Han in 951.

== See also ==
- Tang dynasty in Inner Asia
- Tang campaign against the Eastern Turks
- Tang campaigns against the Western Turks
