= Guo Xiaoke =

General of the Tang dynasty and Anxi Protectorate

- 郭孝恪

Protector-General of Anxi
- In office 642–649
- Appointed by: Taizong of Tang
- Preceded by: Qiao Shiwang
- Succeeded by: Chai Zhewei

Personal details
- Died: January 19, 649 Kucha

Military service
- Battles/wars: Tang campaigns against the Western Turks; Emperor Taizong's campaign against the Western Regions; Tang campaigns against Karasahr; Tang campaign against Kucha

Guo Xiaoke (died 19 January 649) was a general in the early Tang dynasty and General of Anxi Protectorate.

== Biography ==
He was from Yangdi in Xuzhou (present-day Yuzhou, Henan). In his youth he had uncommon ambitions, and his father and elder brothers thought him a ne’er-do-well. At the end of the Sui he led several hundred youths to submit to Li Mi of the Wagang army. Li Mi was delighted and had him, together with Xu Shiji to defend Liyang. After Li Mi was defeated, Xu Shiji sent Guo Xiaoke into Chang’an to surrender to the Tang. Emperor Gaozu of Tang enfeoffed Guo Xiaoke as Duke of Yangdi (Chinese: 阳翟郡公, romanized: Yáng Díjùngōng) and appointed him governor of Songzhou (present-day Shangqiu, Henan), issuing an edict ordering Guo Xiaoke and Xu Shiji to manage the region east of Wulao (present-day Sishui Town, north-west of Xingyang, Henan). In the prefectures and counties they pacified, they were entrusted with selections and appointments.

In 621, when Dou Jiande came to relieve Wang Shichong in Luoyang, Guo Xiaoke went to pay respects to the Prince of Qin, Li Shimin, and offered a plan to hold Wulao firmly, deploy the army to Sishui, and respond flexibly. Li Shimin accepted his advice and won the Battle of Hulao. After Dou Jiande and Wang Shichong were captured, Li Shimin held a great banquet at Luoyang Palace and said to the assembled generals: “Xiaoke devised the stratagem to capture the bandits; Wang Chang advanced first down the canal; their merits indeed stand to the right of you gentlemen.” Guo Xiaoke was promoted to Grand Pillar of State (Chinese: 上柱国, romanized: Shàng zhù guó). He subsequently served as governor of four prefectures: Bei (present-day Qinghe, Hebei), Zhao (present-day Zhao County, Hebei), Jiang (present-day Jiujiang, Jiangxi), and Jing (present-day Jingchuan, Gansu). He was later reassigned as General of the Left Vanguard (左骁卫将军) and was successively elevated to Grand Master of Splendour with the Golden and Purple insignia (金紫光禄大夫).

In 642, Emperor Taizong appointed Guo Xiaoke as commander of Liangzhou (present-day Wuwei, Gansu), and then as Anxi Protector-General and governor of Xizhou (present-day Turfan, Xinjiang). Same year Western Türk qaghan Yukuk Shad attacked Yiwu (modern Yizhou District, Hami) in 642, which had by now been converted into the Tang's Yi Prefecture (伊州). Guo Xiaoke led 2,000 light cavalry to defeated his raiding party. Lhagan also sent the Chuyue (処月) and Chumi (処密) tribes to besiege Tianshan County; Guo Xiaoke again attacked and routed them. Pressing his advantage, Guo advanced, subdued chief of the Chuyue, pursued them to Mount Esuo (遏索山), beheaded over a thousand, and compelled the Chumi tribes to surrender.

In 644, the king of Karasahr (present-day Yanqi, Xinjiang), Long Tuqizhi (龙突骑支) rebelled against Tang and submitted to Western Türk qaghan; Guo Xiaoke requested to attack Karasahr, was appointed Acting Grand Commander of the Xizhou Route. Long Lipozhun (龙栗婆準), a brother of the king, defected to the Tang and served as Guo's guide. Guo planned a surprise attack, marching towards the city from the Yulduz basin, led three thousand infantry and cavalry along the Yinshan route, and attacked the kingdom at dawn. The city fell and the king Long Tuqizhi was captured when the Tang troops swam across the moat that surrounded the city. The Western Turks sent 5,000 cavalry to assist Karasahr. They arrived three days after Guo's departure and captured Long Lipozhun. They then pursued Guo Xiaoke's army, but were defeated by the Tang troops. One of the Western Turk leaders later sent a tudun to rule Karasahr, but the tudun pulled out after receiving threats from the Tang. The people of Karasahr then installed Long Lipozhun's cousin Long Xuepo'anazhi (薛婆阿那支) as their king and remained vassals of the Western Turks.

In 648, Emperor Taizong appointed Ashina She’er as Grand Commander of the Kunqiu Route (昆丘道大总管) and Guo Xiaoke as his deputy to campaign against Kucha. They took the capital; Guo Xiaoke remained to hold it and sent the rest of the army along separate routes to pursue the fleeing Kucha chancellor Nali (那利). However, Guo Xiaoke encamped outside the city and failed to guard against Nali, who colluded with insiders to launch a surprise attack on the Tang army. Guo Xiaoke fought to the death, was killed by a stray Turkic arrow, and his son Guo Daizhao fell with him. General Cao Jishu advanced and retook Kucha. Even though Taizong blamed Guo Xiaoke for poor reconnaissance, posthumously stripping his titles, later, moved by pity for his death in battle, he held mourning for him. When Emperor Gaozong ascended the throne, he posthumously restored Guo Xiaoke's rank and title and granted 300 bolts of cloth as funeral gifts.

== Family ==
He had at least three sons:

1. Guo Daizhao (郭待诏) – died on 19 January 649 alongside his father, posthumously a Roving General (游击将军).
2. Guo Daifeng (郭待封) – rose to General of the Left Leopard-Quelling Guard (左豹韬卫将军). Around 670, serving as deputy to Xue Rengui in the campaign against Tibetan Empire, he was defeated at Battle of Dafei River and, spared death, was reduced to commoner.
3. Guo Daipin (郭待聘) – served as governor of Songzhou (present-day Shangqiu, Henan) during Empress Wu's reign.

== Sources ==
- Wechsler, Howard J. (1979). "T'ai-tsung (reign 626–49) the consolidator". In Twitchett, Dennis (ed.). The Cambridge History of China, Volume 3: Sui and T'ang China, 589–906, Part I. Cambridge: Cambridge University Press. pp. 188–241. ISBN 978-0-521-21446-9.
- Grousset, René (1970). The Empire of the Steppes: A History of Central Asia. Rutgers University Press. ISBN 978-0-8135-1304-1.
