= Emperor Taizong's campaign against the Western Regions =

War in China

Conquest of the Western Regions
- Part of the Tang campaigns against the Western Turks
Date	640–648
Location	Tarim Basin
Result	Decisive Tang victory: Annexation or vassalization of the oasis states; Western Turkic sphere of influence removed from the Tarim Basin; Establishment of the Anxi Protectorate
Territorial changes	Annexation of Karakhoja; Occupation of Tarim Basin

Belligerents
Tang dynasty: Allied Turkic cavalry	640: Karakhoja; 644: Karasahr; 648: Karasahr, Kucha; Western Turkic Khaganate

Commanders and leaders
Emperor Taizong of Tang; 640: Hou Junji; 644: Guo Xiaoke; 648: Guo Xiaoke †; Ashina She'er; Qibi Heli	640: Qu Zhisheng (POW); 644: Long Tuqizhi (POW); 648: Long Xuepo'anazhi (POW) (Karasahr); Haripushpa (POW) (Kucha); Nali † (Kucha)

Following Tang Taizong's subjugation of the Eastern Turkic Khaganate in 630, the emperor began to exert Tang military power toward the oasis city-states of the Tarim Basin (part of the area known as the Western Regions in Chinese history). These states, populated by Tocharian and Saka peoples, were loosely allied with the Western Turkic Khaganate. In 640, Emperor Taizong sent the military commander Hou Junji to conquer Gaochang (Karakhoja). In 644, Karasahr (Yanqi)—an ally in the campaign against Karakhoja—turned against the Tang and was defeated as well. Karasahr later rebelled in 648 along with Kucha. A Tang army under Ashina She'er conquered both Karasahr and Kucha. Kashgar and Khotan in the west also submitted to Tang, allowing the dynasty to dominate the region until it was briefly seized by Tibet in 670.

== Background ==
The First Turkic Khaganate split into the Western and Eastern Turkic Khaganates after a civil war. Allied with the Byzantine Empire, the Western Turks fought in wars against the Sasanian Empire. The Western Turks expanded as the Eastern Turks declined.

Under Shikui Qaghan (r. 611–619), the Western Turks took advantage of the collapsing Sui dynasty to embark on a slew of conquests. The Western Turks reached their apex under Tong Yabghu Qaghan (r. 619–628) when their influence stretched from the Altai Mountains in the northeast to the Aral Sea in the west and covering the Tarim Basin oasis states in the south. They extracted resources such as salt and fish from Yanqi (Karashahr) and developed a friendly relationship with the kingdom of Gaochang (Karakhoja) west of modern day Turpan. In the west, the Western Turks subjugated Tashkent (Shiguo), the Tiele people, Fergana, and Maimargh. They also attacked Persia and Tokharistan in the southwest. During these military campaigns, the Western Turks cultivated friendly relations with the Tang dynasty in the hope that they would not interfere with their expansionist activity.

Eventually, the Western Turks and the Tang dynasty came into conflict over control of the oasis states in the Tarim Basin. In 627, the Karluks rebelled against the Western Turks and in 628, Külüg Sibir murdered his nephew, Tong Yabghu Qaghan, and took the title of qaghan for himself. Tong Yabghu's son, Sy Yabghu Qaghan, fought against Külüg Sibir, splitting the Western Turks into the western Nushibi confederation and the eastern Duolu confederation.

Seven oasis states around Yiwu County in present day Hami City defected to the Tang dynasty in 630 and the Western Yi Prefecture was created to administer the area. In 632, Western Yi Prefecture was upgraded to a regular prefecture called Yi Prefecture. Meanwhile, Sy Yabghu had defeated Külüg Sibir, but he became embroiled in another internal dispute after a failed campaign against the Xueyantuo, which forced him to flee to Samarkand in 632. Duolu Qaghan succeeded him as the new ruler only to die soon after in 634, further weakening the Western Turks' control over their subjects. The oasis states of Shule (Kashgar), Suoche (Yarkant County), and Yutian (Khotan) submitted to the Tang in 632 and 635.

The Western Turks continued to suffer from instability under Duolu's successor, Ishbara Tolis (r. 634–638). He was compelled to divide the people live around the Chu River into two sections, both of which chose their own qaghans.

Gaozu's successor, Emperor Taizong, caused dissent among the Western Turks by supporting claimants to the throne against each other. In 641, he instigated a civil war between the eastern and western confederations of the Western Turks by supporting Isbara Yabghu Qaghan. The qaghan in the east, Tu-lu Qaghan, invaded the oasis states controlled by Isbara Yabghu in the west. He assassinated his rival and unified the Western Turkic Khaganate.

Following the reunification, Tu-lu Qaghan began orchestrating raids against Chinese cities. In 642, Emperor Taizong once again intervened by assisting a revolt against Tu-lu's reign. Disaffected Western Turkic tribes had requested the support of Taizong in Chang'an, who enthroned a new qaghan Irbis Seguy. Irbis Seguy was able to exert control over the Turkic tribes and the former qaghan fled in exile. The Tang court and the Western Turks began negotiating over the control of five oasis states in the Tarim Basin. Irbis Seguy wanted to strengthen his ties with the Tang through a royal marriage to a Tang princess. Although the oasis states were vassals of the Turks, Irbis Seguy did not have the power to simply cede them to the Tang. The possibility of further diplomatic exchanges ended when Taizong began his campaign against Yanqi and Qiuci in 648.

== Campaign against Gaochang (640) ==
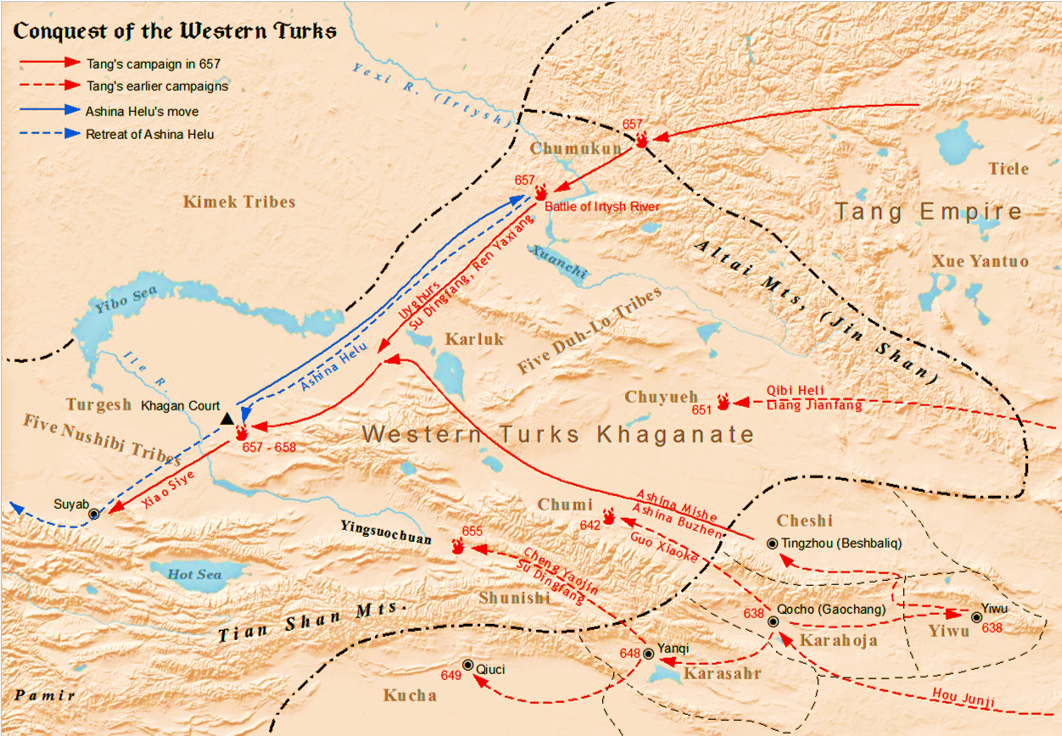
Tang's campaigns against Western Regions and Western Tujue

Gaochang (Karakhoja) was the first of the oasis states to be negatively impacted by the expansion of the Tang dynasty. Gaochang was a centralized kingdom organized under a Chinese form of government. It was the most sinicized of the oasis states, used Chinese writing as its official script and the Chinese language as its administrative language, studied the Chinese classics, and Han people made up a large portion of its population. Gaochang had a monopoly over trade between Chang'an and merchants from the west, generating massive tax revenue and enriching the Gaochang court.

Gaochang had been ruled by the Qu family since 498 and had entered a marriage alliance with the Sui dynasty. In 630, its king Qu Wentai visited Chang'an to pay homage to the Tang, but relations between the two states soured after 632 or 638 when another trade route was opened north of present-day Lop Nur, bypassing Gaochang. Gaochang retaliated by raiding Yanqi, who had requested the opening of the new trade route, and intercepting travelers to China. Qu Wentai entered a military alliance with the Western Turk ruler Tu-lu Qaghan.

With the help of the Western Turks, Gaochang seized Yanqi's territory in 638 and plotted to attack Yi Prefecture as well. In 639, Emperor Taizong reprimanded Qu Wentai and threatened to attack Gaochang if he did not change course. An edict was issued summoning Qu Wentai to the Tang court. The king of Gaochang ignored these demands with the excuse that he was sick. He did not believe that the Tang would be able to mount a successful attack against Gaochang because of the Gobi Desert and the difficulty of supplying a large army. Taizong appointed Hou Junji to lead an expeditionary force against Gaochang. When news arrived in 640 that the Tang army was fast approaching Gaochang, Qu Wentai was caught completely by surprise. With no way to defend against the impending attack, the king fell sick and died suddenly. The Western Turks sent a relief force but they fled as the Tang army approached. Qu Wentai's son, court officials, and a large number of tribal chieftains were captured and taken to Chang'an.

Gaochang was annexed and transformed into Xi Prefecture in modern day Gaochang, Turpan under direct administration. Xi Prefecture was treated like a normal part of the Tang dynasty and land was redistributed based on the equal-field system, household registers were updated every three years, and taxes were levied in the form of corvée labor, grain, and cloth. According to household registers in 640, there were 37,700 people in 8,000 households in Xi Prefecture. Xi Prefecture became the seat of the Protectorate General to Pacify the West, a combined civil and military administration backed by an army.

== Campaign against Yanqi (644) ==
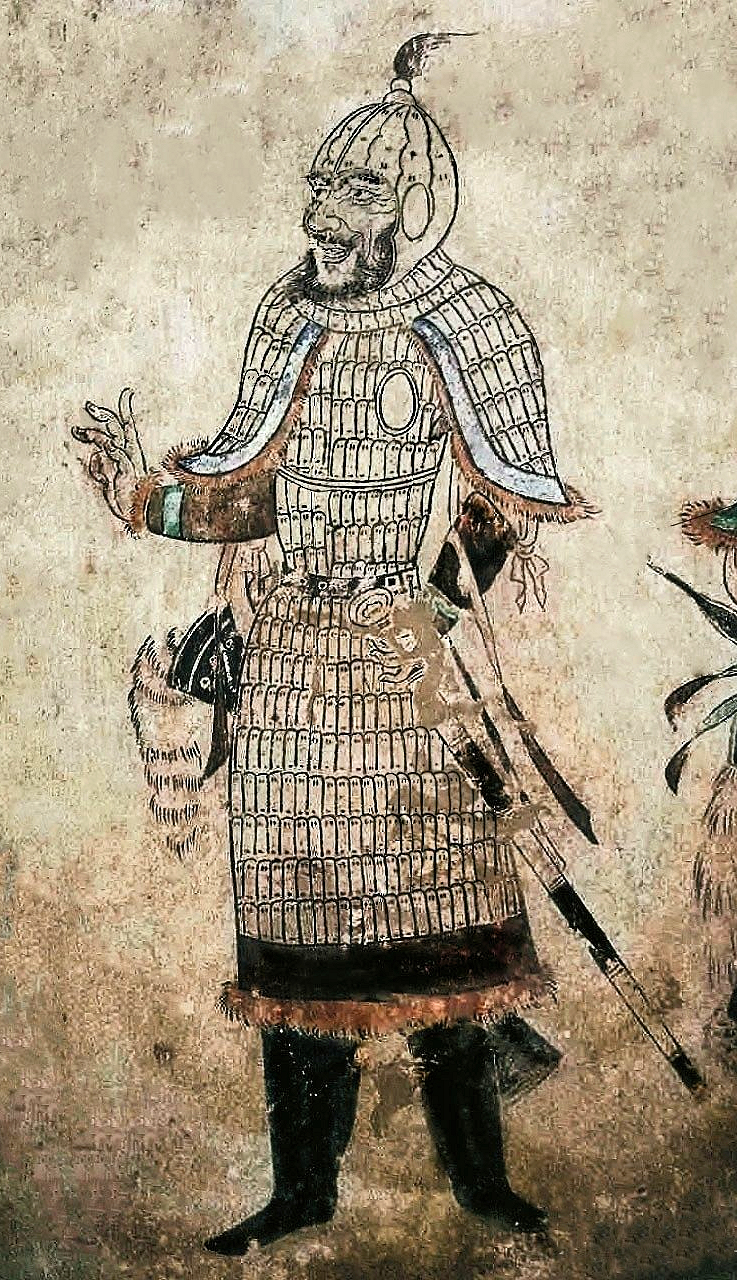
Chinese officer of the Guard of Honour. Tomb of Princess Changle (长乐公主墓), Zhao Mausoleum, Shaanxi province. Tang Zhenguan year 17, i.e. 644 CE

In 632, Yanqi (Karasahr) submitted to the Tang as a tributary state, as did the nearby kingdoms of Shule (Kashgar) and Yutian (Khotan). Tensions between the Tang and Yanqi grew as the Chinese expanded further into Central Asia. After the Tang annexed Gaochang, the Tang army was stationed there only a short distance away from Yanqi, and posed a direct threat to the oasis state.

Yanqi allied with the Western Turkic Khaganate and ceased sending tribute to the Tang court. In 644, a military campaign was dispatched by the Tang emperor against Yanqi. Led by Commander Guo Xiaoke, protectorate-general of the Anxi Protectorate, the army marched towards Yanqi from Yulduz under the cover of night. The Tang forces mounted a surprise attack at dawn, resulting in the defeat of a Western Turk army and the capture of Yanqi's king. Yanqi returned to being a Tang tributary.

== Campaign against Yanqi and Qiuci (648) ==
Yanqi was controlled by proxy through a Tang loyalist, Long Lipozhun, the brother of the captured ruler. He was deposed in 648 by his cousin with the support of the kingdom of Qiuci (Kucha), nominally a Tang vassal, and the Western Turks. In 648, the Tang conducted a second military campaign against Yanqi, commanded by Ashina She'er, a member of the Turkic Ashina royal family who had submitted to the Tang. Yanqi fell, the usurper was beheaded, and Tang rule was re-established under another Tang loyalist who declared himself a loyal vassal. A Chinese military garrison was established in the kingdom, the first of the Four Garrisons of Anxi.

After the fall of Yanqi, Ashina Sh'er's army marched towards the neighboring kingdom of Qiuci (Kucha). Qiuci was nominally a vassal of the Tang but it aided Yanqi in its rebellion in 644 and also stopped paying tribute to the Tang.

She'er's decoy horsemen led the defending Qiuci forces, numbering 50,000 soldiers, into an ambush. The Qiuci soldiers retreated to the nearby city of Aksu after their defeat. The Tang army besieged the city for forty days. Qiuci surrendered on 19 January 649 and She'er captured the king. The surrounding tribes loyal to Qiuci submitted to the Tang.

Qiuci was placed under the control of the Anxi Protectorate under Guo Xiaoke, but remnants of Qiuci's forces returned with Western Turk allies and recaptured the city, killing Guo. Ashina She'er retook the city and killed 11,000 of the conquered inhabitants as reprisal for the death of Guo Xiaoke. With the defeat of Qiuci and the submission of the three oasis states further west, the Tang gained control of the entire Tarim Basin. In 649, the seat of the Anxi Protectorate was moved to Qiuci and the Four Garrisons of Anxi were established in Qiuci (Kucha), Shule (Kashgar), Yutian (Khotan), and Yanqi (Karasahr).

== Aftermath ==
Following the conquest of the western oasis states, Ashina Helu, a former Tang Turkic general in Gansu, declared himself qaghan of the Western Turks, unifying the Turkic tribes under a single khaganate. Helu invaded the kingdoms of the Tarim Basin and led frequent raids against bordering Tang cities. Emperor Gaozong sent an army led by Su Dingfang to defeat the Western Turks. The Turkic commanders Ashina Mishe and Ashina Buzhen, rivals of Helu, led the side divisions. With allied Uyghur forces, the Tang army led by Su defeated Helu and captured him in 657.

The Tang emperor Gaozong installed two puppet qaghans, the cousins Ashina Buzhen and Ashina Mishe, to control the former territory of the Western Turks by proxy. Gaozong divided the ten tribes of the area among the two cousins. Buzhen (Jiwangjue Qaghan) governed the five Nushibi tribes located in the west while Mishe (Xingxiwang Qaghan) governed the five Duolu tribes located in the east. The son of Buzhen, Khusrau (Huseluo), and the son of Mishe, Yuanqing, resided in Chang'an, the capital of the Tang, while their fathers administered the former khaganate as qaghans. However, Mishe was killed by Buzhen in 662 and Buzhen was himself killed in 666. Empress Wu Zetian sent Yuanqing and Khusrau westward in 685 to succeed their fathers as proxy rulers. Neither of the qaghans were able to successfully exert control. Turkic tribes resisted Yuanqing's rule and he was captured by the Tibetan Empire between 686-689. After his release, Yuanqing chose to return to the Tang instead of the Western Turks. He was executed in 692. Khusrau was able to bring the western tribes temporarily under his rule, but was defeated in 690 during an invasion by the Second Turkic Khaganate, and he too was forced to escape to the Tang with 60,000 followers. Later attempts to install puppet qaghans failed, and the title was reduced to a symbolic position in the Tang court.

In 670, a Western Turkic tribe allied with the Tibetan Empire and invaded the Tarim Basin. The Anxi protectorate was abandoned and the Tang withdrew back to Xi Prefecture (Gaochang). Control of the oasis states returned to the Tang between 673 and 675, and the protectorate was re-established for a brief time. The Tibetans recaptured the region in 677. The Tang defeated the Turks under Ashina Duzhi in 679 and captured Suiye but it is uncertain if they retook the Four Garrisons of Anxi. Some argue that the protectorate was not re-established until 692.

Ilterish Qaghan of the Eastern Turks founded the Second Turkic Khaganate after a successful revolt in 682. The expansion of the khaganate continued under Ilterish's brother, Qapaghan Qaghan. In 712, Kul Tigin, son of Ilterish, defeated the remnants of the Western Turks, members of the Turgis confederation. Now defeated, the Western Turks were absorbed into the new empire.

== Sources ==
- Old Book of Tang, vols. 194, part 2, 198.
- New Book of Tang, vols. 215, part 2,, 221.
- Zizhi Tongjian, vols. 194, 195, 196, 197, 198, 199.
- Baumer, Christopher (2012), The History of Central Asia: The Age of the Steppe Warriors, I.B. Taurus
- Beckwith, Christopher I. (2009). Empires of the Silk Road: A History of Central Eurasia from the Bronze Age to the Present. Princeton University Press. ISBN 978-1-4008-2994-1.
- Benn, Charles D. (2002). China's Golden Age: Everyday Life in the Tang Dynasty. Oxford University Press. ISBN 978-0-19-517665-0.
- Saito, Shigeo (2017), Protection and Research on Cultural Heritage in the Chuy Valley, the Kyrgyz Republic, Institute of History and Cultural Heritage of the National Academy of Sciences of the Kyrgyz Republic
- Findley, Carter Vaughn (2004). The Turks in World History. Oxford University Press. ISBN 978-0-19-988425-4.
- Golden, Peter B. (1992), An Introduction to the History of the Turkic Peoples: Ethnogenesis and State-Formation in Medieval and Early Modern Eurasia and the Middle East, Otto Harrassowitz
- Grousset, René (1970). The Empire of the Steppes: A History of Central Asia. Rutgers University Press. ISBN 978-0-8135-1304-1.
- Hansen, Valerie (2012). The Silk Road: A New History. Oxford University Press. ISBN 978-0-19-515931-8.
- Millward, James A. (2007). Eurasian Crossroads: A History of Xinjiang. Columbia University Press. ISBN 978-0-231-13924-3.
- Skaff, Jonathan Karem (2009). Nicola Di Cosmo (ed.). Military Culture in Imperial China. Harvard University Press. ISBN 978-0-674-03109-8.
- Skaff, Jonathan Karam (2012). Sui-Tang China and Its Turko-Mongol Neighbors: Culture, Power, and Connections, 580–800. Oxford University Press. ISBN 978-0-19-973413-9.
- Twitchett, Denis (2000). H. J. Van Derven (ed.). Warfare in Chinese History. BRILL. ISBN 978-90-04-11774-7.
- Twitchett, Denis; Wechsler, Howard J. (1979). "Kao-tsung (reign 649–83) and the empress Wu: the inheritor and the usurper". In Twitchett, Dennis (ed.). The Cambridge History of China, Volume 3: Sui and T'ang China, 589–906, Part I. Cambridge, England: Cambridge University Press. pp. 242–289. ISBN 978-0-521-21446-9.
- Wang, Zhenping (2013), Tang China in Multi-Polar Asia: A History of Diplomacy and War, University of Hawaii Press
- Wechsler, Howard J. (1979). "T'ai-tsung (reign 626–49) the consolidator". In Twitchett, Dennis (ed.). The Cambridge History of China, Volume 3: Sui and T'ang China, 589–906, Part I. Cambridge, England: Cambridge University Press. pp. 188–241. ISBN 978-0-521-21446-9.
