= Four Garrisons of Anxi =

Tang dynasty military campaigns

- Traditional Chinese: 安西四鎮
- Simplified Chinese: 安西四镇
Transcriptions
Standard Mandarin
- Hanyu Pinyin: Ānxī Sìzhèn
- Wade–Giles: Anhsi Szuchen

Tang campaigns against the city-states in the Western Regions.

The Four Garrisons of Anxi (Four Garrisons to Pacify the West) were Chinese military garrisons installed by the Tang dynasty in the Tarim Basin between 648 and 658. They were stationed at the Indo-European city-states of Qiuci (Kucha), Yutian (Hotan), Shule (Kashgar) and Yanqi (Karashahr) or Suiye (Suyab) in modern Xinjiang. For a period from 670-693, the Protectorate General to Pacify the West was headquartered in Suiye (Suyab in modern Kyrgyzstan), listed as one of the four garrisons from 679 to 719 instead of Yanqi, before moving back to Qiuci in 693 for the remainder of the duration of the Four Garrisons, which were conquered by the Tibetan Empire in 790.

== History ==
The Anxi Protectorate was created in Xi Prefecture (Gaochang) after the Tang dynasty successfully annexed the oasis kingdom in 640. The protectorate was moved to Qiuci in 648 after the Tang dynasty defeated Kucha. However, due to local unrest with support from the Western Turkic Khaganate the Tang protector general was assassinated, and the protectorate was moved back to Xi Prefecture in 651. When the Tang dynasty defeated the Western Turkic Khaganate in 658, the protectorate headquarter was moved back to Qiuci. The full establishment of the Four Garrisons, and with them a formal Tang military protectorate over the Tarim Basin, is therefore dated to 658 after Ashina Helu's defeat. The oasis states of Yutian (Khotan), Shache (Yarkand), Shule (Kashgar), Qiuci (Kucha), and Yanqi (Karasahr) retained their ruling families but garrisons were placed in the cities and they answered to the Protector-General of Anxi.

Following the decline of Turkic hegemony over the region, the Tibetan Empire became the primary contender for power with the Tang dynasty. The Tibetan Empire repeatedly invaded the Tarim Basin and neighboring kingdoms in 670. The Western Regions were highly contested, and ownership of areas switched repeatedly between Tibetan Empire and the Tang dynasty. During this period the protectorate headquarter was moved to Suiye, also known as Suyab. The Tang achieved relative stability after 692 and moved the protectorate back to Qiuci where it remained until the protectorate's demise in the 790s. Suiye was listed as one of the four garrisons from 679 to 719 before it was captured by the Turgesh khagan Suluk. The Tang recaptured Suiye in 748 and destroyed it. According to the Old Book of Tang, Shule had been destroyed by the Tibetans. However by 698, envoys from the king of Shule offered gifts to the Tang. The Tang later sent someone to bestow investiture on the king of Shule in 728.

In 702 Wu Zetian created the Beiting Protectorate and granted it control of Ting Prefecture (Jimsar County), Yi Prefecture (Hami) and Xi Prefecture.

The Tibetan Empire continued to attack the Anxi Protectorate but were unable to gain a foothold until the An Lushan Rebellion occurred in 755. The Tang dynasty recalled the majority of their garrison troops from the frontier to deal with the rebellion and thus allowed the Tibetans an opportunity to invade the Tang borderlands with impunity. In 763 a large Tibetan army managed to occupy the Tang capital of Chang'an for a brief period of time before they were forced to retreat. In the same year the Tibetan Empire occupied Yanqi.

The neighboring Hexi Corridor and Beiting Protectorate were also invaded. Under the Hexi Jiedushi, the Tang lost Liang Prefecture in 764, Gan and Su prefectures in 766, Gua Prefecture in 776, and Sha Prefecture in 787. The Beiting Protectorate lost Yi Prefecture in 781, Ting Prefecture in 790, and Xi Prefecture in 792.

The Anxi Protectorate lost its seat in Qiuci in 787 and Yutian in 792. However in 789, the monk Wukong passed through Shule, Yutian, Gumo (Aksu), Qiuci, Yanqi, and Ting Prefecture and found that they all had Chinese commanders and were free from Tibetan or Uyghur control. It is unclear what happened to Shule.

== Cities ==
=== Kucha (Qiuci) ===
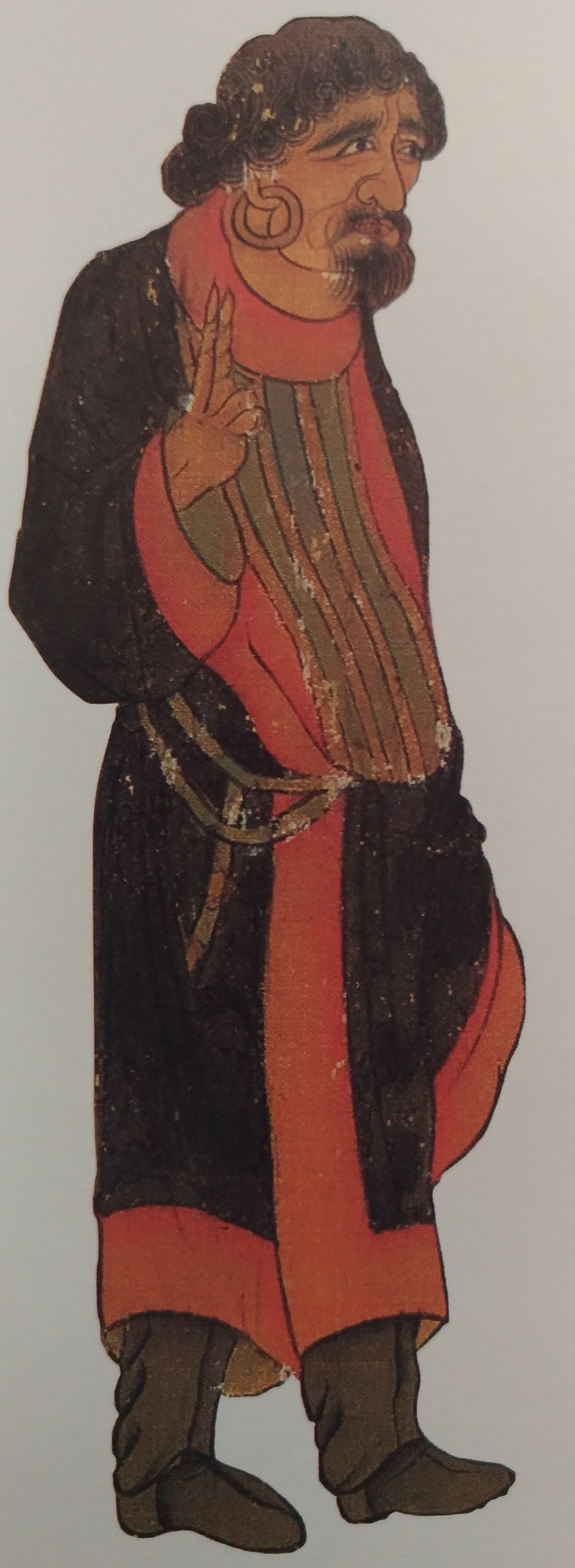
Kuchan tributary from Yan Liben's Wáng huí tu.

The Buddhist monk Xuanzang visited Kucha in the 630s and described it in the following manner:

The soil is suitable for rice and grain...it produces grapes, pomegranates and numerous species of plums, pears, peaches, and almonds...The ground is rich in minerals-gold, copper, iron, and lead and tin. The air is soft, and the manners of the people honest. The style of writing is Indian, with some differences. They excel other countries in their skill in playing on the lute and pipe. They clothe themselves with ornamental garments of silk and embroidery.... There are about one hundred convents in this country, with five thousand and more disciples. These belong to the Little Vehicle of the school of the Sarvastivadas.Their doctrine and their rules of discipline are like those of India, and those who read them use the same originals....About 40 li to the north of this desert city there are two convents close together on the slope of a mountain...Outside the western gate of the chief city, on the right and left side of the road, there are erect figures of Buddha, about 90 feet high.

=== Karasahr (Yanqi) ===
According to the Book of Zhou, compiled around 636, Karasahr was a small and poor country composed of several walled towns:

Wedlock is about the same as among the Chinese. All the deceased are cremated and then buried. They wear mourning for seven full days, after which they put it off. The adult men all trim their hair to make a head decoration. Their written characters are the same as those of India. It is their custom to serve "Heavenly God(s)" but they also show reverence and trust in the law of the Buddha. They especially celebrate these days: the eighth day of the second month, and the eighth day of the fourth month. All the country abstains and does penance according to the teachings of Śākya, and follows His Way. The climate is cold, and the land good and fertile. For cereals, hey have rice, millet, pulse, wheat, and barley. For animals, they have camels, horses, cows, and sheep. They raise silk-worms but do not make silk, merely using [the silk fiber] for padding. It is their custom to relish grape wine, and also to love music. It is some ten li north of a body of water, and has an abundance of fish, salt, and rushes. In the fourth year of the period Pao-ting, its king sent an envoy to present its renowned horses. (Zhoushu, published 636 CE; translation by Roy Andrew Miller.)

=== Kashgar (Shule) ===
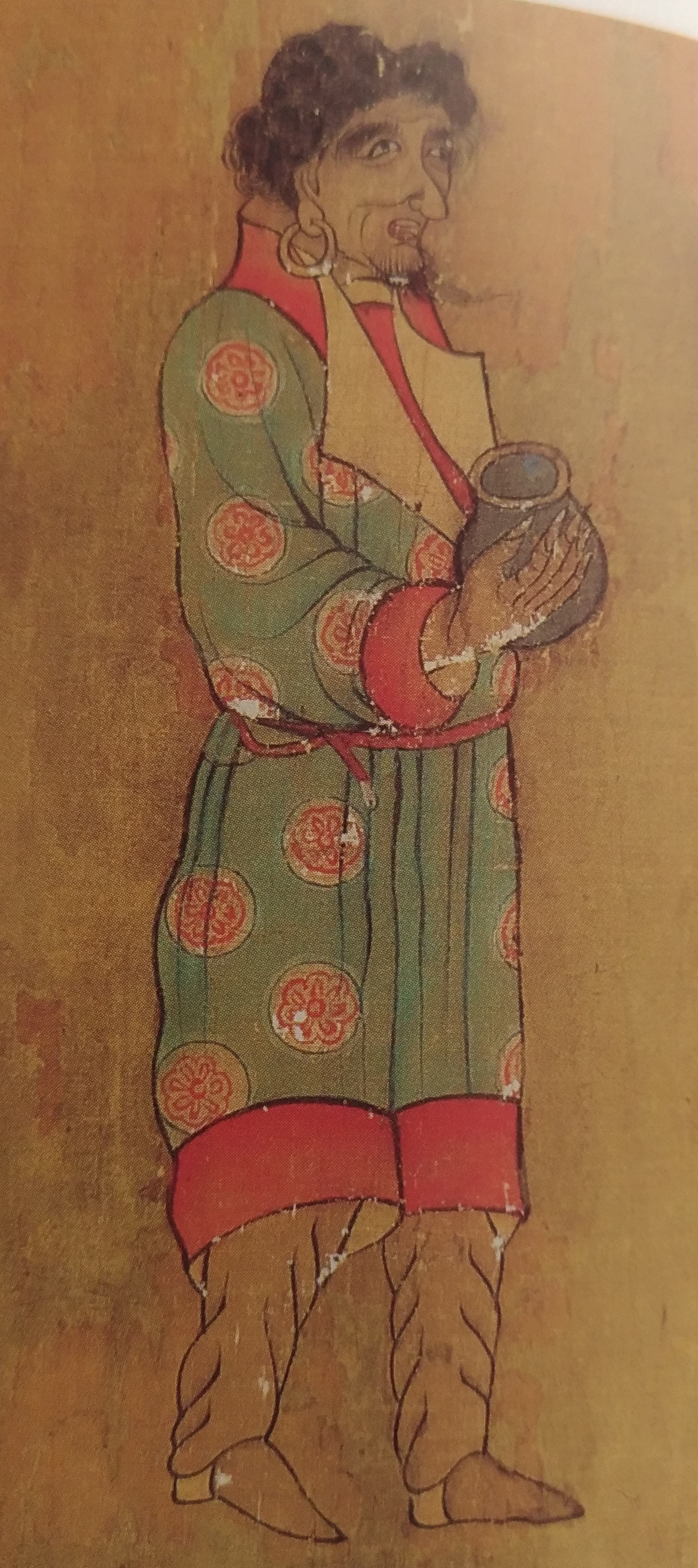
Khotanese tributary from Yan Liben's Wang hui tu.

Xuanzang visited Kashgar around 644.

His first impression of the approach to China's westernmost oasis was of many sand heaps and little fertile soil. Commenting on the oasis itself, he said that "it yielded good crops and a luxuriance of fruit and flowers." How inviting the orchards, the city walls, the winding lanes, and the mudbrick walls of houses must have been! After the bleak and thinly populated Pamirs, how heart-warming the sight of streams of people coming and going, ponies and donkeys laden with goods, heralding an important trade center. Xuanzang went to the famous bazaar at Kashgar. "One gets from this country felt and cloth of excellent quality as well as fine woolen materials. Moreover, the inhabitants are clever at weaving various kinds of fine, fleecy carpets." Xuanzang also remarks that the people have green eyes, suggesting the Sogdian or East Iranian origin of some of the population.

In Kashgar, there were hundreds of Buddhist monasteries with more than a thousand monks, most of whom were of a realist Hinayana school. Remains of two Buddhist sites near Kashgar still exist. The first, the Cave of Three Immortals, dating from the second century, is hewn from the cliffs of the Quiakmakh River. It now stands thirty feet high above the river bed. It has two chambers; traces of wall paintings survive in the left chamber. The second site, the ancient village of Hanoi, had been a thriving Buddhist settlement in Tang times. Xuanzang is believed to have visited the Mauri-tim stupa there.

— Sally Hovey Wriggins

=== Khotan (Yutian) ===
Xuanzang visited Khotan in 644 and stayed there for eight months.

This country he describes as being above 4,000 Ii in circuit, more than half of it being sand-dunes; the cultivated land, which was very limited, yielded cereals and fruits of various kinds; the country produced rugs, fine felt, and silk of artistic texture, it also yielded white and black jade. The climate was genial, but there were whirlwinds and flying dust. The people were of gentle disposition, fond of the practical arts; they were in easy circumstances, and had settled occupations. The nation esteemed music and the people were fond of dance and song; a few clothed themselves in woollens and furs, the majority wearing silk and calico .. . . The system of writing had been taken from that of India, but the structure had been slightly altered by a sort of successive changes; the spoken language differed from that of other countries.

=== Suyab (Suiye) ===
Xuanzang's visit to Suyab.

From Qing Lake I traveled five hundred li northwest to Suyab city, which is almost six to seven li in circumference, where various foreign merchants live together.… Several dozen cities with high ramparts situated in the west of Suyab, though they are not directly subordinate, are under the administration of the Turks.… I walked four hundred li from Suyab to Qianquan 千泉 (Bing-bu-laq) … where the Qaghan of the Turks had his summer residence.… One hundred and forty or fifty li west from Qianquan is the city of Talas … I walked around ten li further south, and nearly three hundred families who used to be Chinese reside there in a lonely town. After being pillaged by the Turks, they changed their costume into the Turkish style, but kept Chinese customs and continued to speak their mother tongue.

Wang Fangyi (622-684) was an adjutant in the army of the Tang general Pei Xingjian (622-684) during his expedition to restore Narsieh to the throne of Persia. He built a city at Suyab in 679. According to a stele inscription for Wang Fangyi, Suyab had dense streets with a mixed population of Chinese and foreigners. The Old Book of Tang says that Suyab was surrounded by twelve gates on four sides that were curved to hide its inhabitants. The sight perplexed the barbarians.

== See also ==
- Chinese Turkestan
- Chinese military history
- Administrative divisions of the Tang dynasty
- Tang dynasty in Inner Asia
- Tang–Tibet relations
