= Ashina She'er =

Dubu Qaghan
- Reign: 628–634
- Predecessor: Tong Yabghu Qaghan
- Successor: Shikui Qaghan
- Born: c. 609
- Died: 655 (aged c. 46); Chang'an, Tang dynasty
- Burial: Zhao Mausoleum
- Spouse: Princess Hengyang (衡陽公主)
- Issue: Ashina Buzhen; Ashina Daozhen (阿史那道真)
Names
- Ashina She'er (阿史那社爾 or 阿史那社尒)
Regnal name
- Dubu Qaghan (都布可汗)
Posthumous name
- Duke Yuan of Bi (畢元公)
- House: Ashina
- Father: Ashina Xichun

Ashina She'er (Chinese: 阿史那社爾; c. 609–655), regnal name Dubu Qaghan (都布可汗), posthumous name Duke Yuan of Bi (畢元公), was a qaghan of the Western Turkic Khaganate and a military general of the Tang dynasty.

== Early life ==
Ashina She'er was born in 609 as second the son of Ashina Xichun. He was granted title To shad and appanage of Tiele and Xueyantuo tribes in northern part of Gobi Desert when he was 11. However he was deposed by local rebellious tribes when his uncle Illig Qaghan went to campaign against the Tang. As a result, he fled to the Western Turkic Khaganate and took over Beshbaliq and Karakhoja, claiming the title of Dubu Khagan. As he viewed Xueyantuo as the source of Illig's downfall, he vowed vengeance against Xueyantuo, and he attacked Zhenzhu Khan in or around 634 with a 50,000 strong army, which had indecisive results. However, at that time a new Western Turkic khan, Ishbara Tolis, had just taken the throne, and a large portion of Ashina She'er's people were not willing to continue fighting, Ishbara, allowing Xueyantuo to counterattack and defeat Ashina She'er. Therefore, he abandoned his goal of being khagan and fled to Gaochang.

== In the Tang army ==
He submitted to the Tang with his followers in 635 and was immediately appointed as a general of the left guard. He was married to Princess Hengyang (衡陽公主), a sister of Emperor Taizong in 636. He participated in conquest of Turfan as a commander in 640. He later joined Goguryeo–Tang War (where he was wounded in action) and campaign against Xueyantuo.

He personally led a Tang campaign against Kucha in 648 with a 100,000 strong Tiele cavalry. His deputy commanders were Qibi Heli (a Tiele chieftain who had also become a Tang general) and Guo Xiaoke. The campaign was a success but his deputy Guo was murdered by rebellious Kucheans. In retribution for his death, Ashina She'er ordered the execution of eleven thousand Kuchean inhabitants by decapitation. It was recorded that "he destroyed five great towns and with them many myriads of men and women... the lands of the west were seized with terror." After Kucha's defeat, Ashina dispatched a small force of light cavalry led by the lieutenant Xue Wanbei to Khotan, ruled by the king Yuchi Fushexin. The threat of an invasion convinced the King to visit the Tang court in person. He was made the Duke of Bi (畢國公) by Taizong for his successes.

== Later life ==
He requested to commit suicide and be buried alongside Taizong or to be appointed as the guard of his tomb. However, he was dissuaded from that by the new emperor Gaozong, who made him a general of the right guard. He died in 655 and was buried alongside Taizong. He was accorded the posthumous name Yuan (元).

== Family ==
He was married to Princess Hengyang (衡陽公主) and had two sons, Ashina Buzhen and Ashina Daozhen (阿史那道真) who was a general and participated as a deputy of Xue Rengui in the war against Tibetan Empire in 670.

== In popular media ==
He was portrayed by Qumuqu Huoqiufeng in 2017 Chinese costume drama "The World of Chang'an" (天下长安).

He was portrayed by Kudousi Jiang Ainiwaer in 2021 Chinese costume drama “The long ballad”(长歌行)

== Sources ==
- Old Book of Tang, vol. 59
- New Book of Tang, vol. 35
