= Artificial cranial deformation =

Form of body alteration

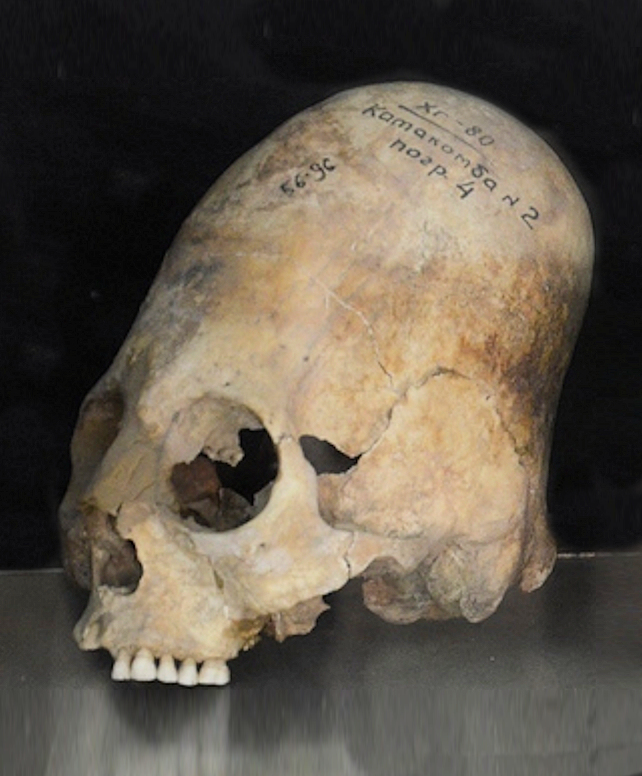
- Elongated skull excavated in Samarkand (600–800 CE), Afrasiab Museum of Samarkand

Details
- Synonyms: Head binding, head flattening, head shaping
- System: Skeletal system
- Location: Skull

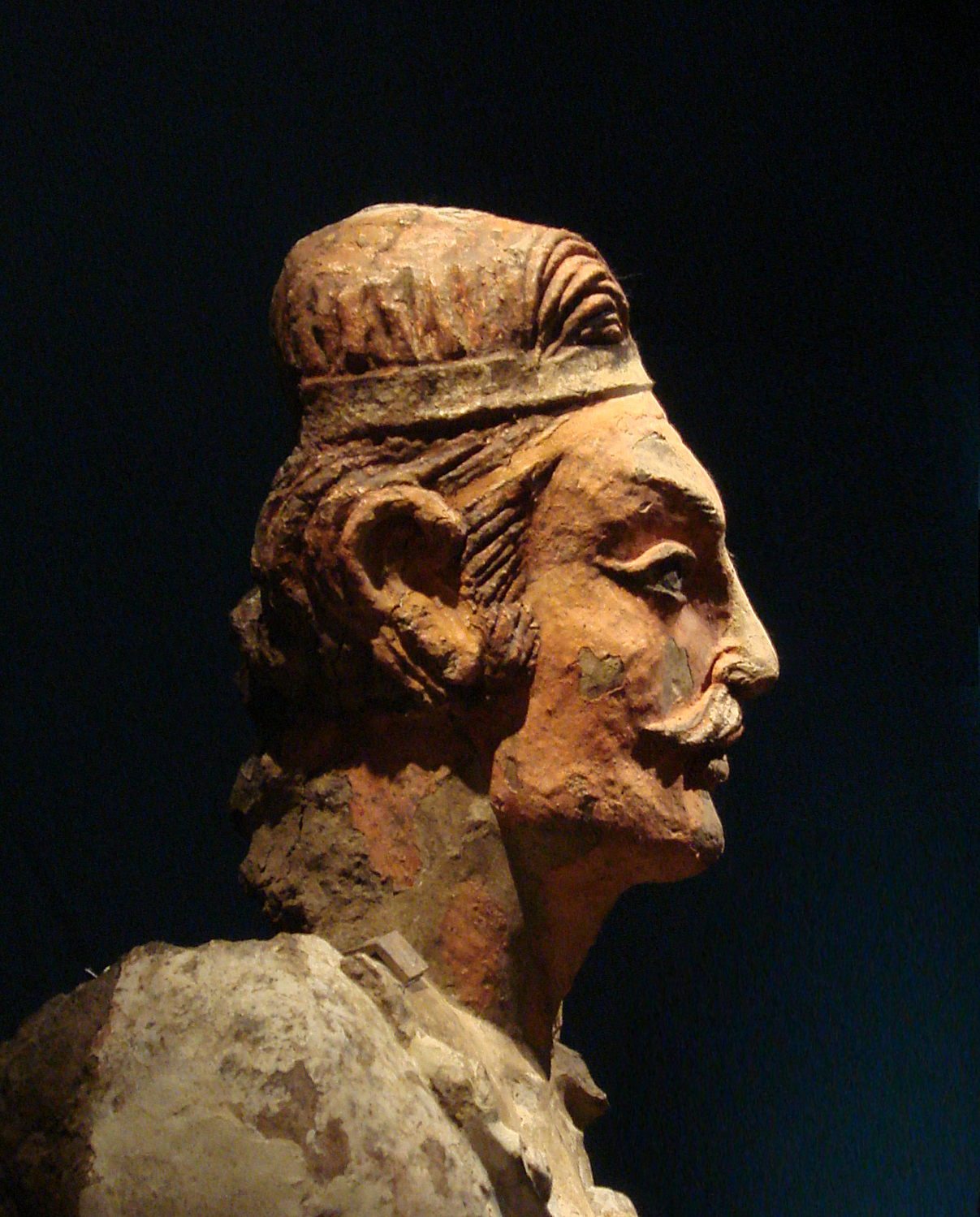
Portrait of a Yuezhi prince from Khalchayan, circa 1st century CE, showing elongated skull.

Artificial cranial deformation or modification, head flattening, or head binding is a form of body alteration in which the skull of a human being is deformed intentionally. It is done by distorting the normal growth of a child's skull by applying pressure. Flat shapes, elongated ones (produced by binding between two pieces of wood), rounded ones (binding in cloth), and conical ones are among those chosen or valued in various cultures.

Typically, the alteration is carried out on an infant, when the skull is most pliable. Because of this, artificial cranial modification most commonly occurs during the first three years of the individual's life.

== History ==
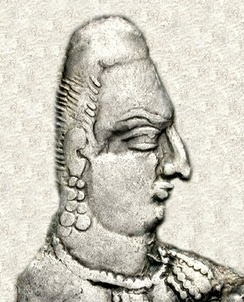
Portrait of Alchon Hun king Khingila, from his coinage, c. 450 CE

Intentional cranial deformation predates written history; it was practiced commonly in a number of cultures that are widely separated geographically and chronologically, and still occurs today in a few areas, including Vanuatu.

The earliest suggested examples were once thought to include Neanderthals and the Proto-Neolithic Homo sapiens component (9th millennium BCE) from Shanidar Cave in Iraq. The view that the Neanderthal skull was artificially deformed was common for a period. However, later research by Chech, Grove, Thorne, and Trinkaus, based on new cranial reconstructions in 1999, questioned the earlier findings and concluded: "we no longer consider that artificial cranial deformation can be inferred for the specimen". It is thought elongated skulls found among Neolithic peoples in Southwest Asia were the result of artificial cranial deformation.

The earliest written record of cranial deformation comes from Hippocrates in about 400 BCE. He described a group known as the Macrocephali or Long-heads, who were named for their practice of cranial modification. (Note: Alternate English translations include: Hippocrates (1849). The Genuine Works of Hippocrates. Translated by Francis Adams. New York: William Wood.; Hippocrates (1752). Hippocrates Upon Air, Water, and Situation; Upon Epidemical Diseases; and Upon Prognosticks, In Acute Cases Especially. Translated by Francis Clifton (2nd ed.). London: John Whiston, Benj. White, and Lockyer Davis. pp. 22–23.)

=== Eurasia ===
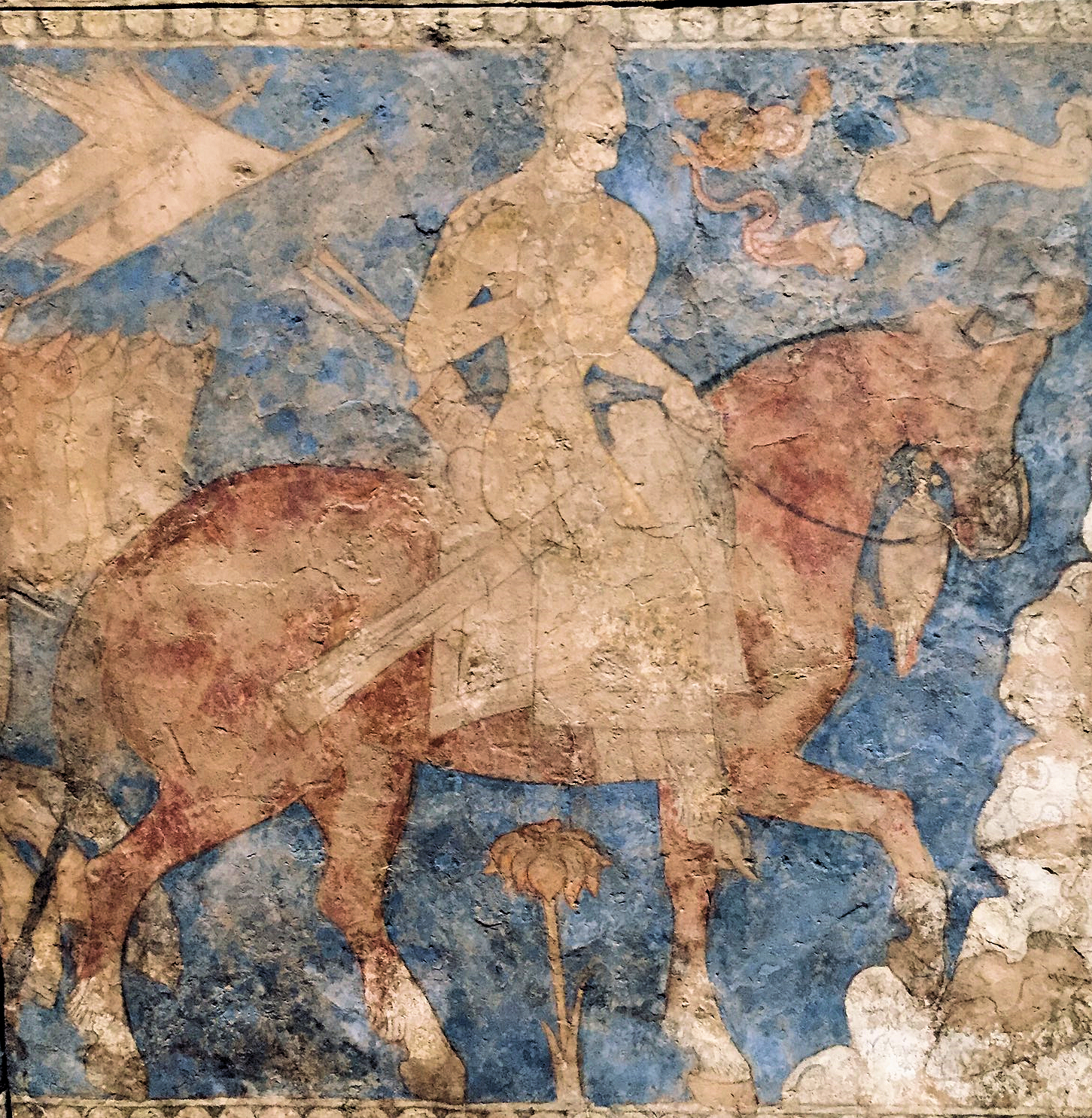
Legendary Iranian king Rostam, depicted in this 7th-century CE mural at Panjikent, Sogdia, with an elongated skull in the fashion of the Alchon Huns.

The earliest known cases of artificial headshaping in Eurasia were brought to light in the sites such as Ganj Dareh, in western Iran, and are dated to the 8th millenium BCE. These altered skulls were the result of tight bandages applied around the person's head during infancy. It is debated whether the resulting deformation was the intended result, or a byproduct of child-rearing techniques.

Artificial headshaping becomes widespread in the Near East during the Ubaid Period, and is attested in an area that now lies within modern-day Turkey, Iraq and Iran. It has been proposed that, within this context, headbinding can denote sociocultural or ethnic affiliation. However, the limited data available from Ubaid-period burial complexes and the absence of written sources makes it difficult to ascertain why exactly cranial modification was practiced in this context.

The practice was introduced in Bactria and Sogdiana by the Yuezhi, a tribe that created the Kushan Empire. Men with such skulls are depicted in various surviving sculptures and friezes of that time, such as the Kushan prince of Khalchayan.

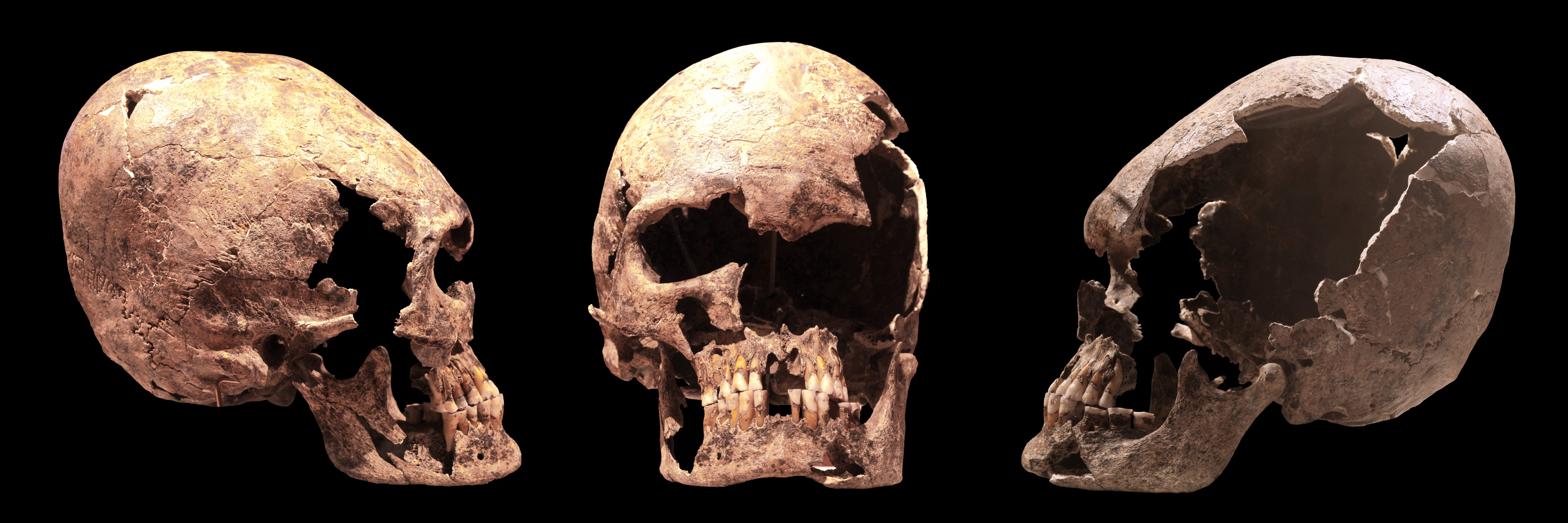
Elongated skull of a young woman, probably an Alan.

Alchon kings are generally recognized by their elongated skulls, a result of artificial skull deformation. Archaeologist Cameron Petrie wrote that "The depictions of elongated heads suggest that the Alchon kings engaged in skull modification, which was also practised by the Hun groups that appeared in Europe." The elongated skulls appear clearly in most portraits of rulers in the coinage of the Alchon Huns, and most visibly on the coinage of Khingila. These elongated skulls, which they obviously displayed with pride, distinguished them from other peoples, such as their predecessors the Kidarites. On their coins, the spectacular skulls came to replace the Sasanian crowns which had been current in the region's coinage. This practice is also known among other peoples of the steppes, particularly the Huns, and as far as Europe, where it was introduced by the Huns themselves.

In the Pontic steppe and the rest of Europe the Huns, including the Proto-Bulgarians, are also known to have practiced similar cranial deformation, as were the Alans.

In Late Antiquity (300–600 CE), the East Germanic tribes who were ruled by the Huns—the Gepids, Ostrogoths, Heruli, Rugii, and Burgundians—adopted this custom. Among the Lombards, the Burgundians, and the Thuringians, this custom seems to have comprised women only.

In 5th century Pannonia, as the region progressively left the Roman sphere of influence, artificially modified skulls become more frequent in the archaeological record. These are interpreted as a sign of the arrival of external groups in the region, most likely Huns.

In western Germanic tribes, artificial skull deformations have rarely been found.

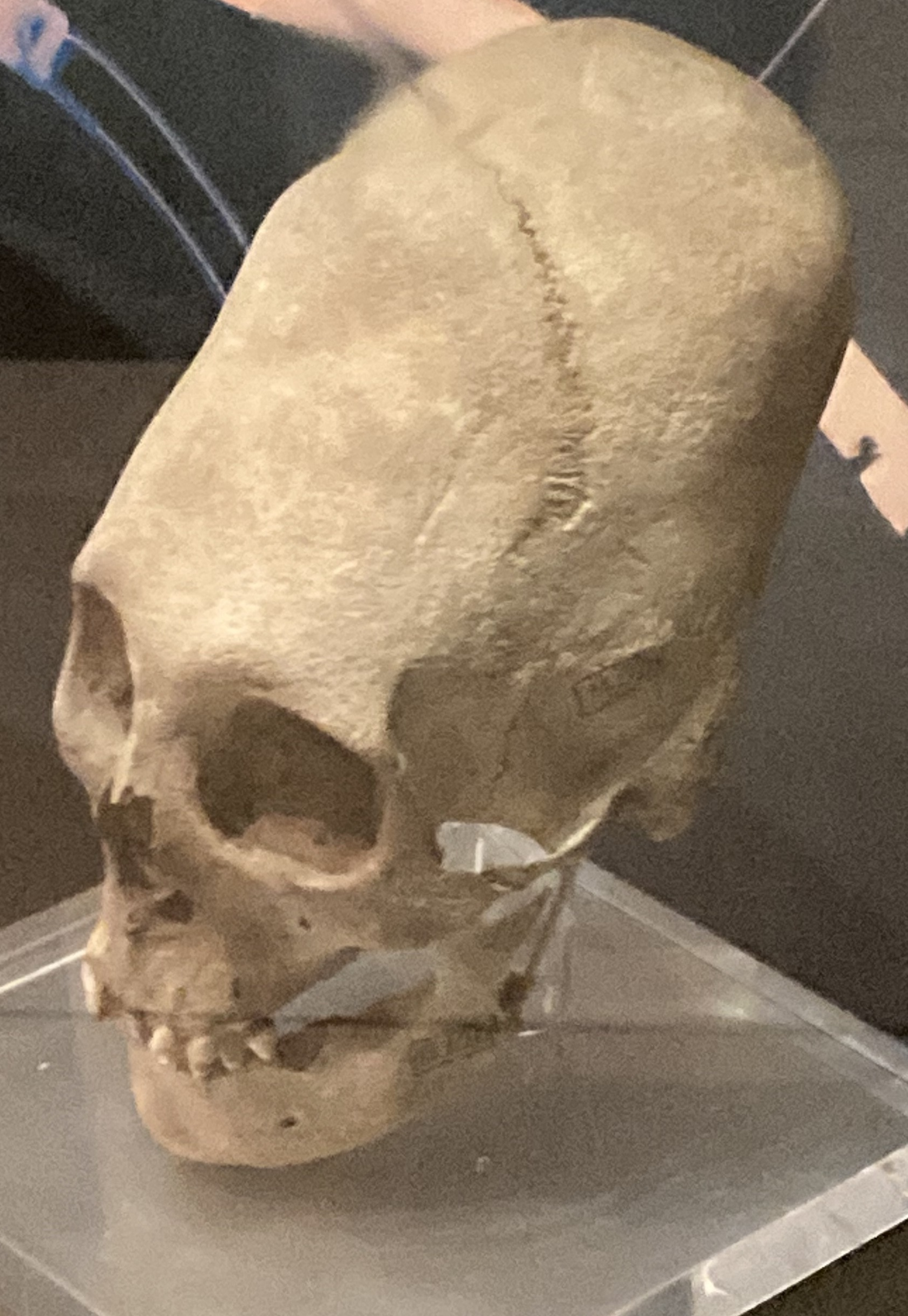
Female skull found in Mozs, Hungary, c. 5th century

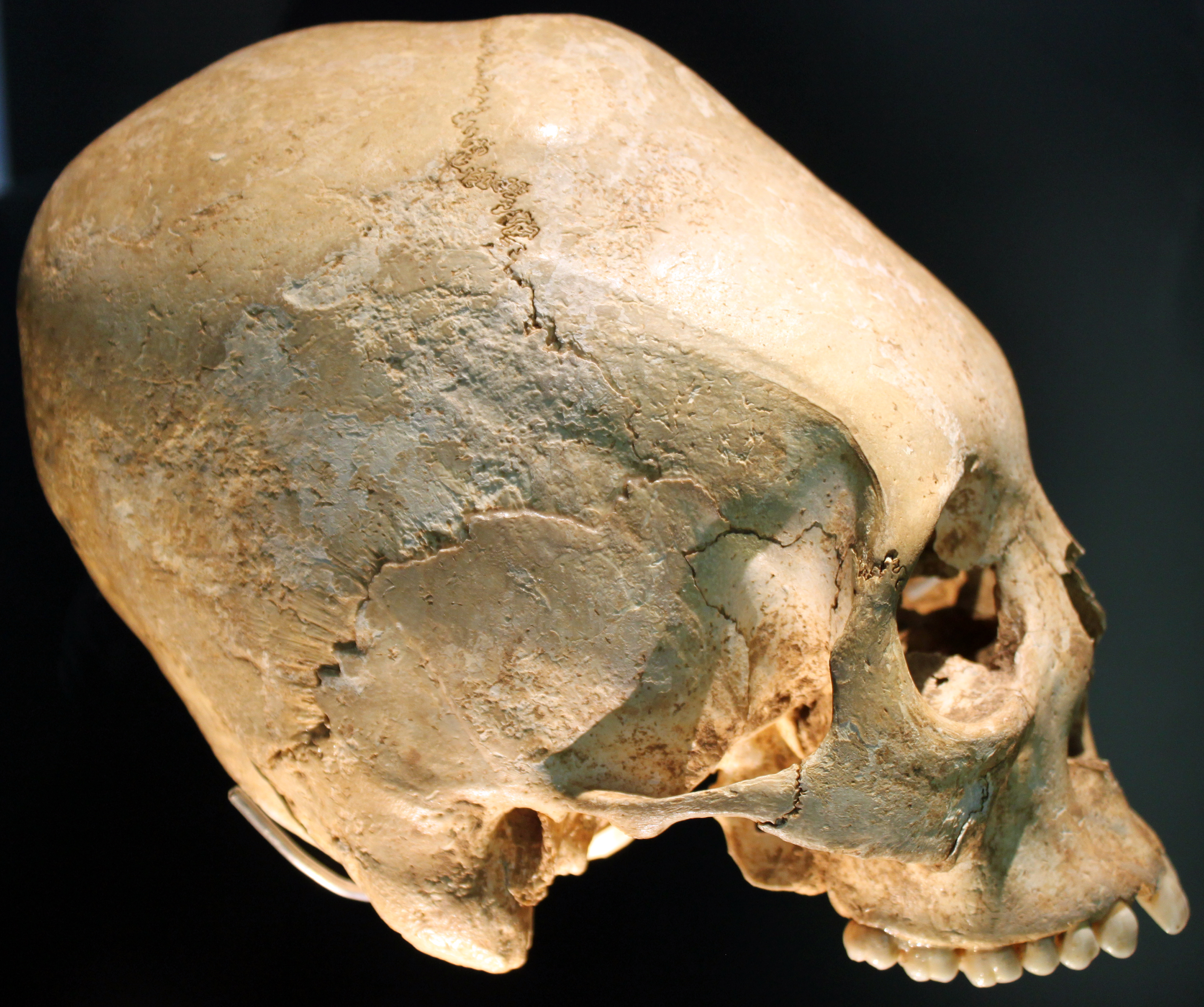
Elongated skull, early 6th-century Alemannic culture, Landesmuseum Württemberg

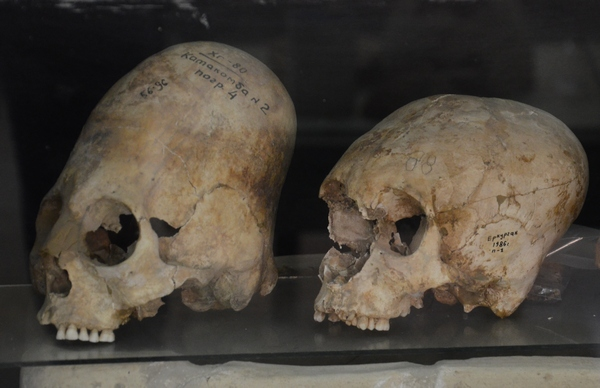
Elongated skulls from Afrasiab, Samarkand, Sogdia, 600–800 CE

Elongated skulls of three women have been discovered among Viking-era burials during the eleventh century at Gotland, Sweden. Researchers have interpreted them as perhaps belonging to women who were not native to the island in a culture characterized as one having extensive trading relationships.

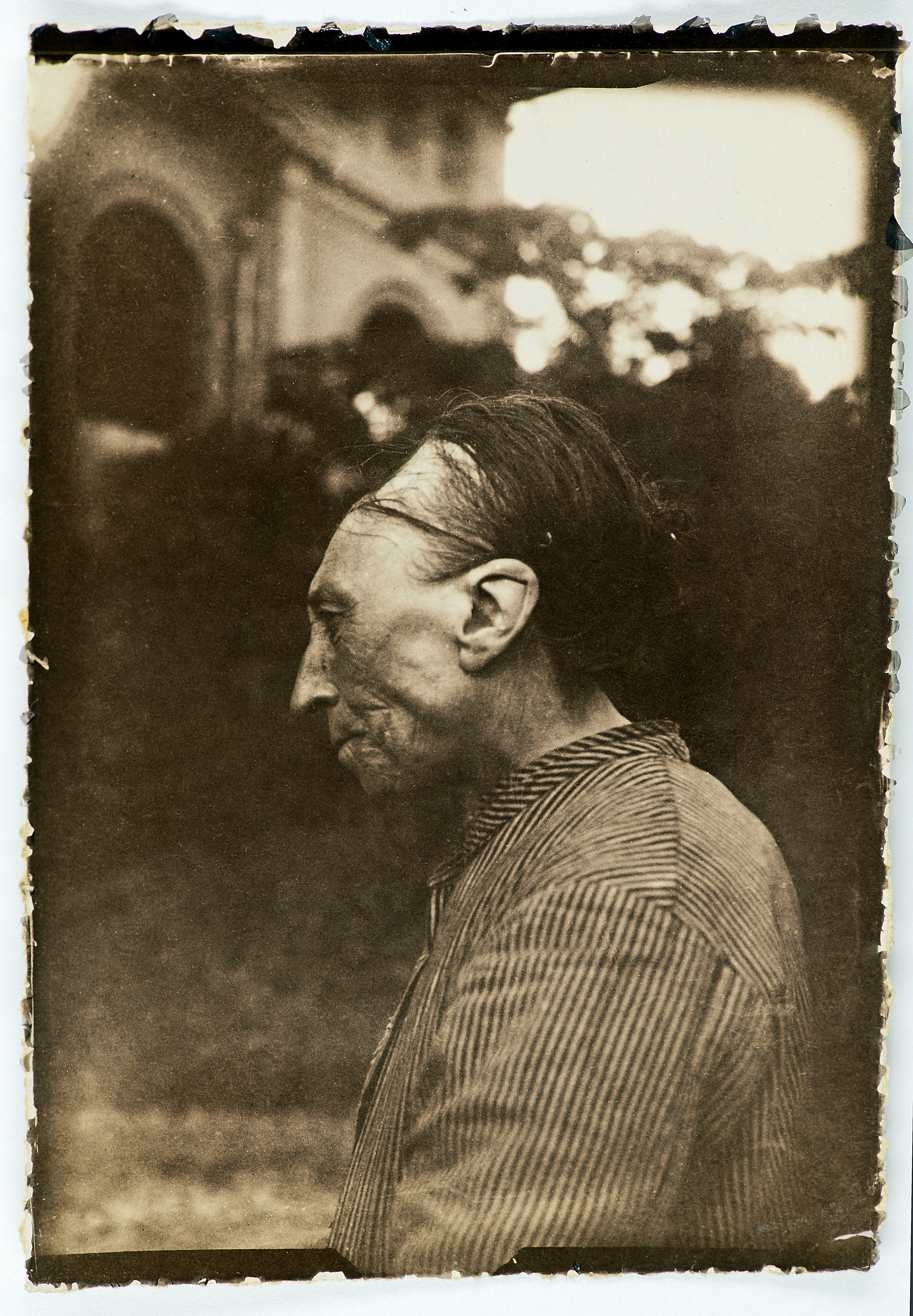
Deliberate elongation of the skull, "Toulouse deformity", France

The custom of binding babies' heads in Europe in the twentieth century, though dying out at the time, was still extant in France, and also found in pockets in western Russia, the Caucasus, and in Scandinavia among the Sámi. The reasons for the shaping of the head varied over time, from aesthetic to pseudoscientific ideas about the brain's ability to hold certain types of thought depending on its shape. In the region of Toulouse (France), these cranial deformations persisted sporadically up until the early twentieth century. Rather than being intentionally produced as with some earlier European cultures, Toulousian deformations seemed to have been the unwanted result of an ancient medical practice among the French peasantry known as bandeau, in which a baby's head was tightly wrapped and padded to protect it from impact and accident shortly after birth. In fact, many of the early modern observers of the deformation were recorded as pitying these peasant children, whom they believed to have been lowered in intelligence due to the persistence of old European customs.

=== Americas ===
In the Americas, the Maya, Inca, and certain tribes of North American natives performed the custom. It has been proposed that among the Maya, the practice was often done in order to reduce the size of the occipital bun, considered preventive of courage and valor. Its elimination, through cranial modification as an infant, could help limit the negative effects associated with this part of the skull as an adult.

In North America, the practice was known, especially among the Chinookan tribes of the Northwest and the Choctaw of the Southeast. The Bitterroot Salish (also known as Flathead Indians) were widely believed to have engaged in this practice. The Salish themselves believe that this misconception was born because their identifying sign in the Coast Salish Sign Language involved pressing both hands to opposite sides of their heads. Other tribes, including both Southeastern tribes like the Choctaw and Northwestern tribes like the Chehalis and Nooksack Indians, practiced head flattening by strapping the infant's head to a cradleboard.

The practice of cranial deformation was also practiced by the Lucayan people of the Bahamas and the Taínos of the Caribbean.

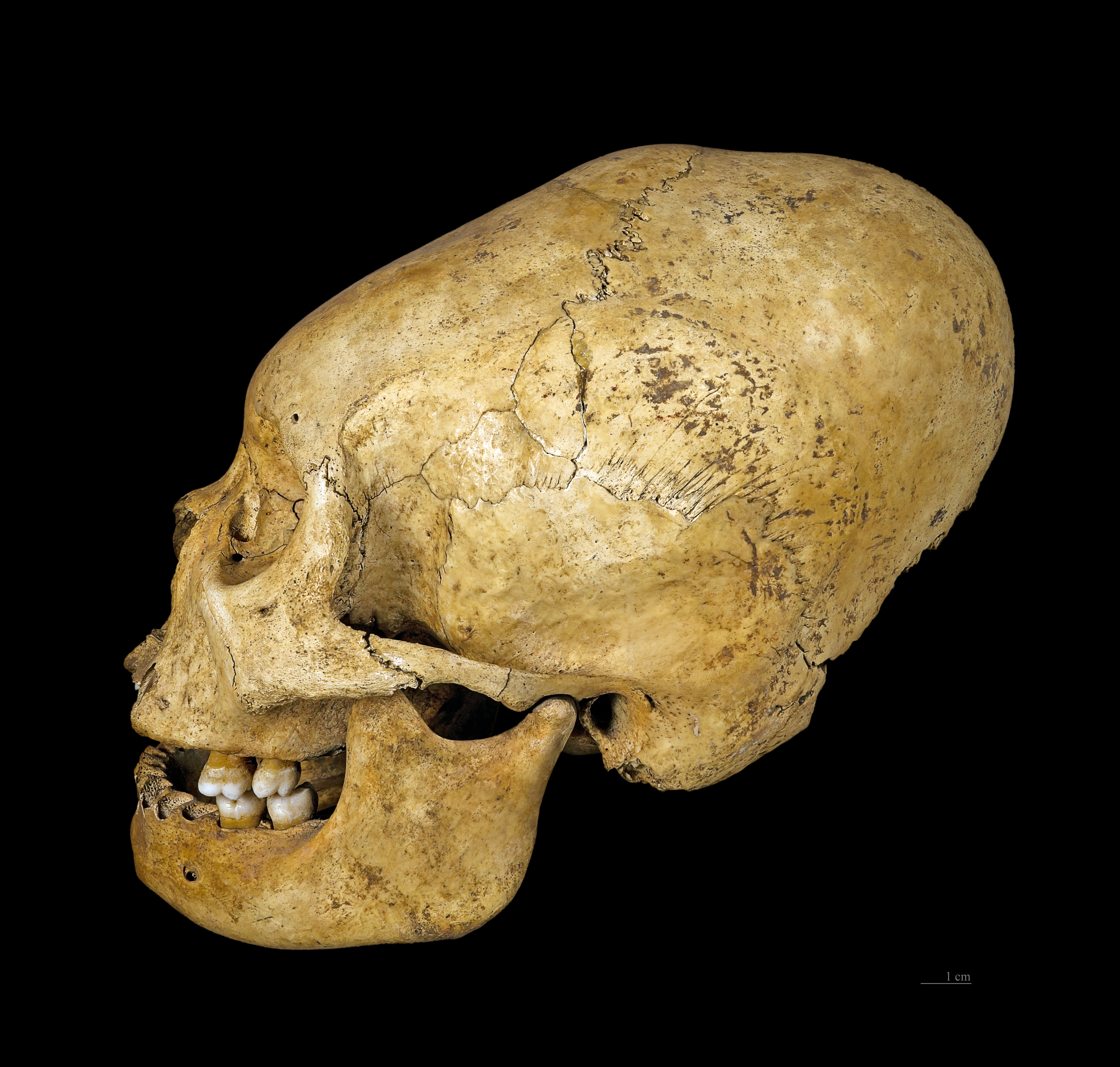
Proto-Nazca elongated skull, c. 200–100 BCE

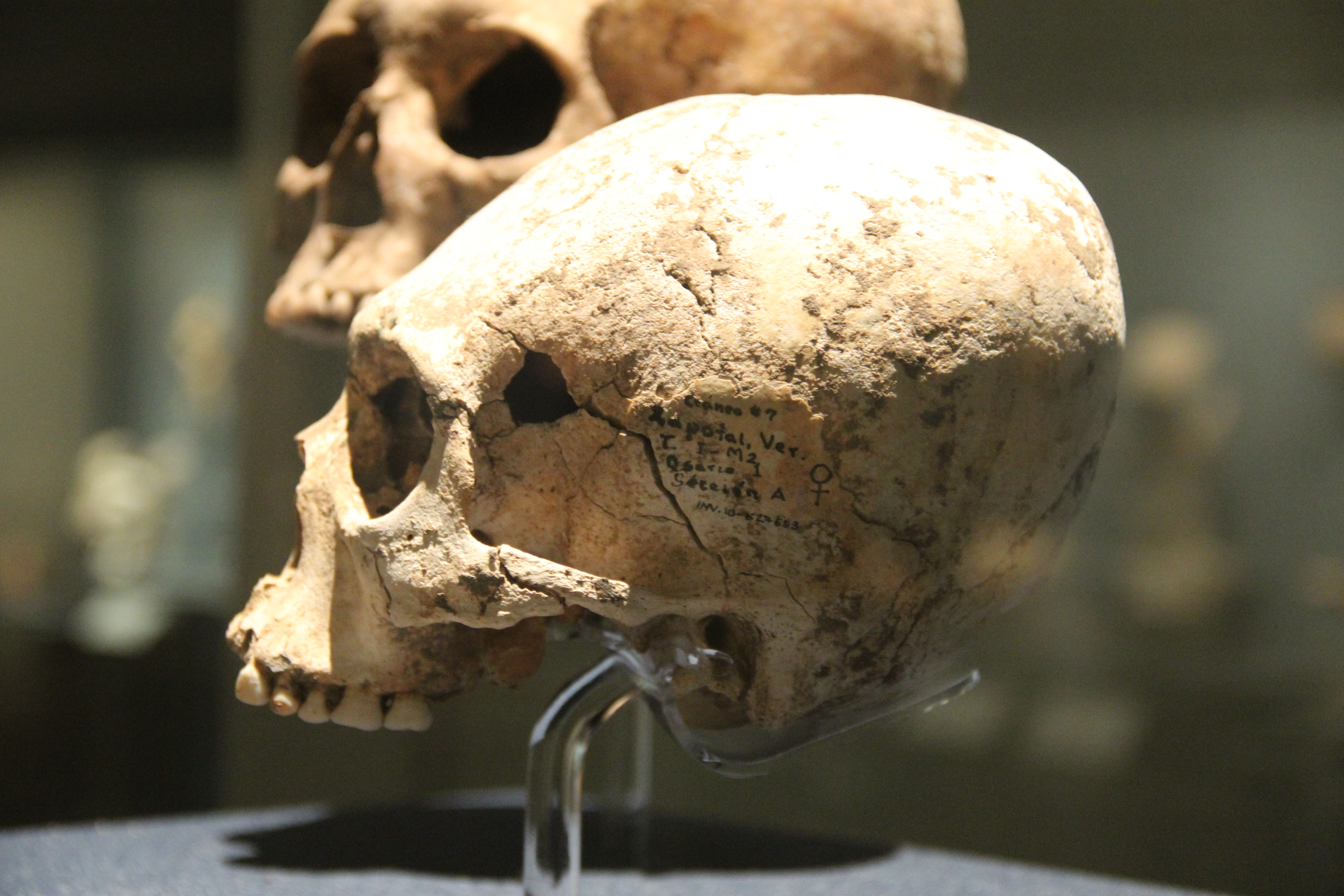
An elongated female human skull in Olmec and Gulf Coast Gallery, in the National Museum of Anthropology (Mexico)

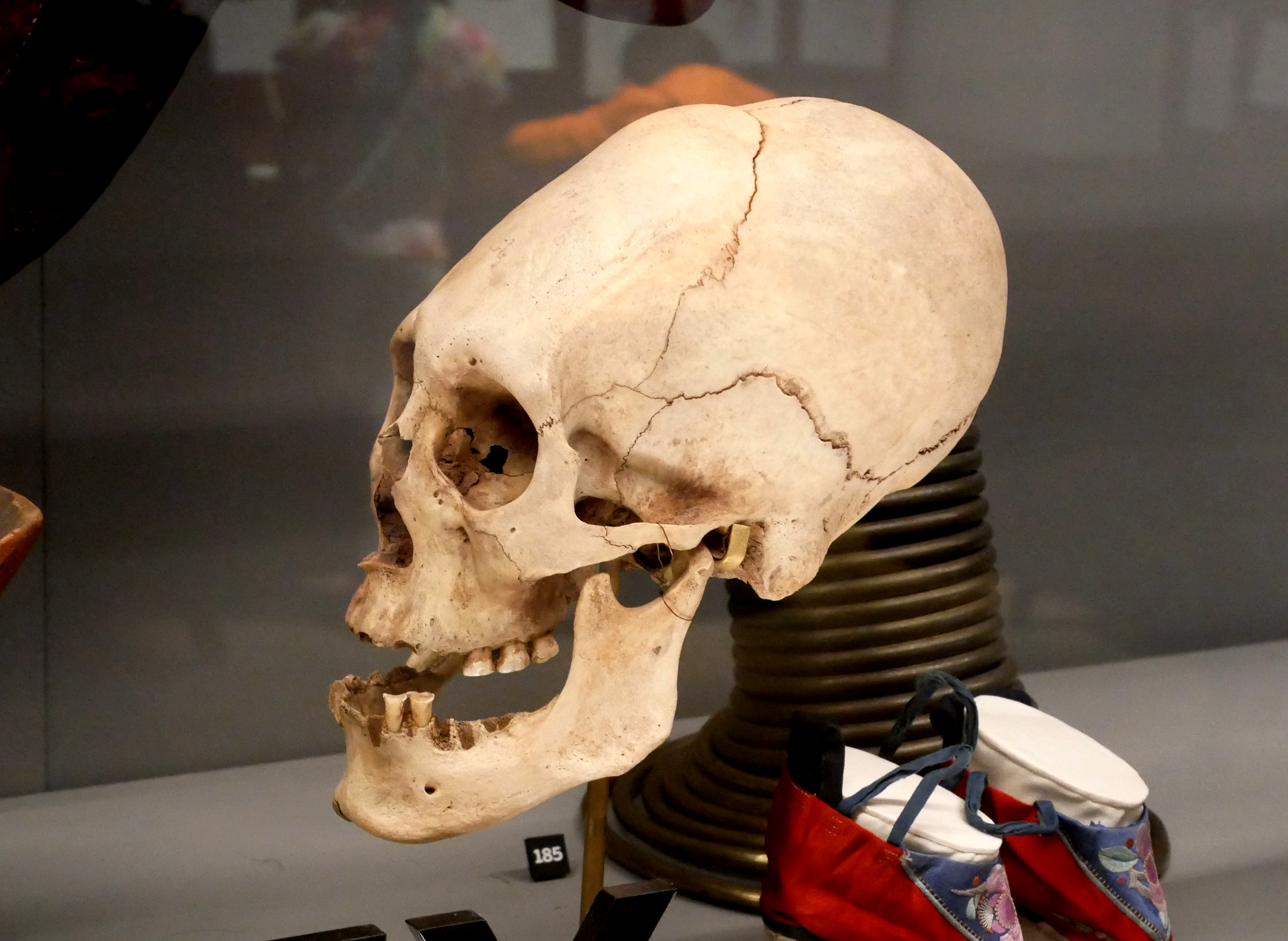
Tiwanaku skull from Bolivia, on display in the Horniman Museum, London

=== Austronesia ===
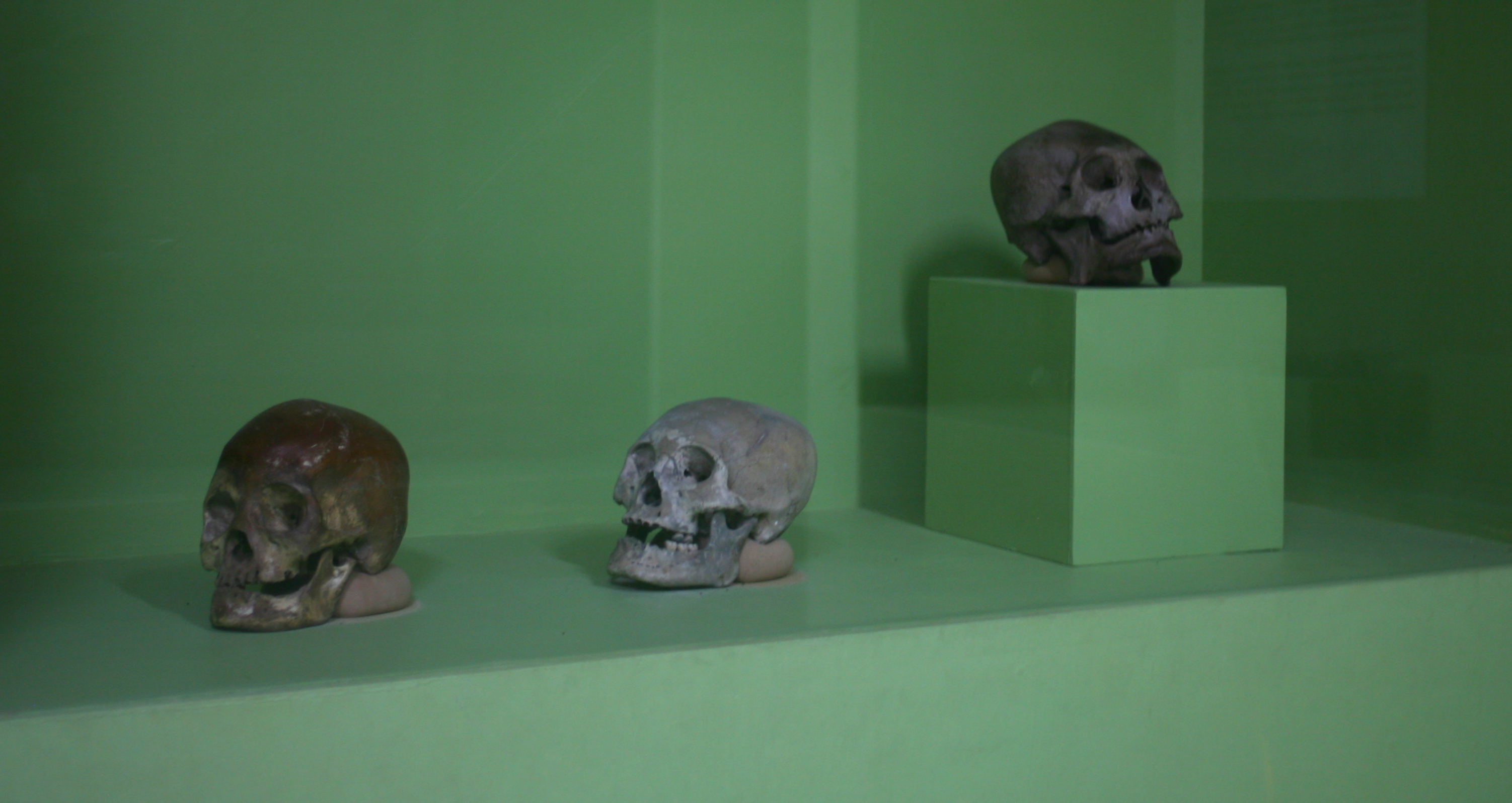
Visayan flattened skulls (tinangad) from the Butuan National Museum, Philippines

The Visayans and the Bikolano people of the central islands of the Philippines practiced flattening the foreheads (and sometimes the back of the heads) widely in the pre-colonial period, particularly in the islands of Samar and Tablas. Other regions where remains with artificial cranial deformations have been found include Albay, Butuan, Marinduque, Cebu, Bohol, Surigao, and Davao. The pre-colonial standard of beauty among these groups were of broad faces and receding foreheads, with the ideal skull dimensions being of equal length and width. The devices used to achieve this include a comb-like set of thin rods known as tangad, plates or tablets called sipit, or padded boards called saop. These were bound to a baby's forehead with bandages and fastened at the back.

They were first recorded in 1604 by the Spanish priest Diego Bobadilla. He reported that in the central Philippines, people placed the heads of children between two boards to horizontally flatten their skulls towards the back, and that they viewed this as a mark of beauty. Other historic sources confirmed the practice, further identifying it as also being a practice done by the nobility (tumao) as a mark of social status, although whether it was restricted to nobility is still unclear.

People with flattened foreheads were known as tinangad. People with unmodified crania were known as ondo, which literally means "packed tightly" or "overstuffed", reflecting the social attitudes towards unshaped skulls (similar to the binatakan and puraw distinctions in Visayan tattooing). People with flattened backs of the head were known as puyak, but it is unknown whether puyak were intentional.

Other body modification practices associated with Philippine artificial cranial deformation include blackened and filed teeth, extensive tattooing (batok, which was also a mark of status and beauty), genital piercings, circumcision, and ear plugs. Similar practices have also been documented among the Melanau of Sarawak, the Minahasans of Sulawesi, and some non-Islamized groups in Sumatra.

Friedrich Ratzel reported in 1896 that deformation of the skull, both by flattening it behind and elongating it toward the vertex, was found in isolated instances in Tahiti, Samoa, Hawaii, and the Paumotu group, and that it occurred most frequently on Mallicollo in the New Hebrides (today Malakula, Vanuatu), where the skull was squeezed extraordinarily flat.

It was also practiced at least into the 1930s on the island of New Britain in the Bismarck Archipelago of Papua New Guinea.

=== Africa ===
In Africa, the Mangbetu elongated their heads. Traditionally, babies' heads were wrapped tightly with cloth, called "Limpombo", in order to give them this distinctive appearance. The practice began dying out in the 1950s.

=== Japan ===
On the southern Japanese island of Tanegashima, from the third century to the seventh century, a group may have bound the skulls of babies to flatten the back of the skull, possibly as an expression of group identity to facilitate the trade of shell goods.

=== China ===
Cranial deformation was also practiced in the Neolithic period at the Houtaomuga Site in Northeast China. Most had fronto-occipital modification, but there were other types of modification discovered as well. It was found that the practice had been maintained for thousands of years, some skulls being much older than others.

== Methods and types ==
Deformation usually begins just after birth for the next couple of years until the desired shape has been reached or the child rejects the apparatus.

There is no broadly established classification system for cranial deformations, and many scientists have developed their own classification systems without agreeing on a single system for all forms observed. An example of an individual system is that of E. V. Zhirov, who described three main types of artificial cranial deformation—round, fronto-occipital, and sagittal—for occurrences in Europe and Asia, in the 1940s.

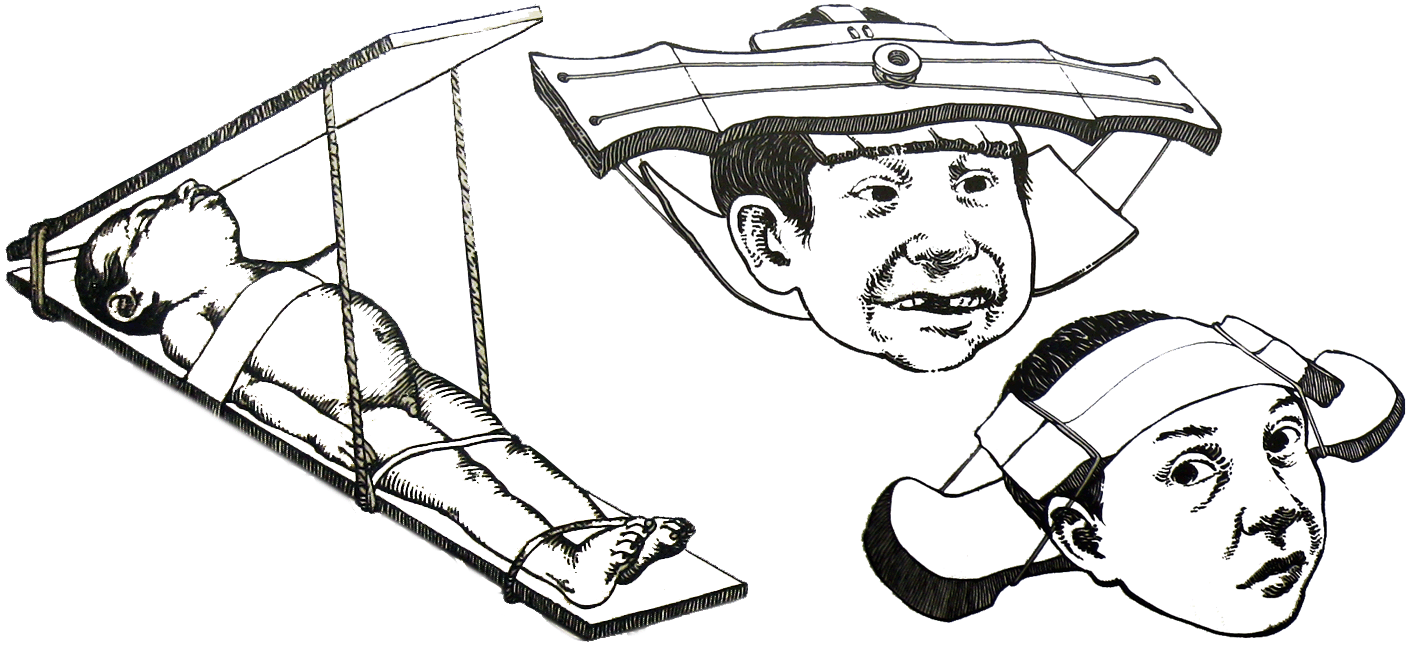
Various methods used by the Mayan people to shape a child's head

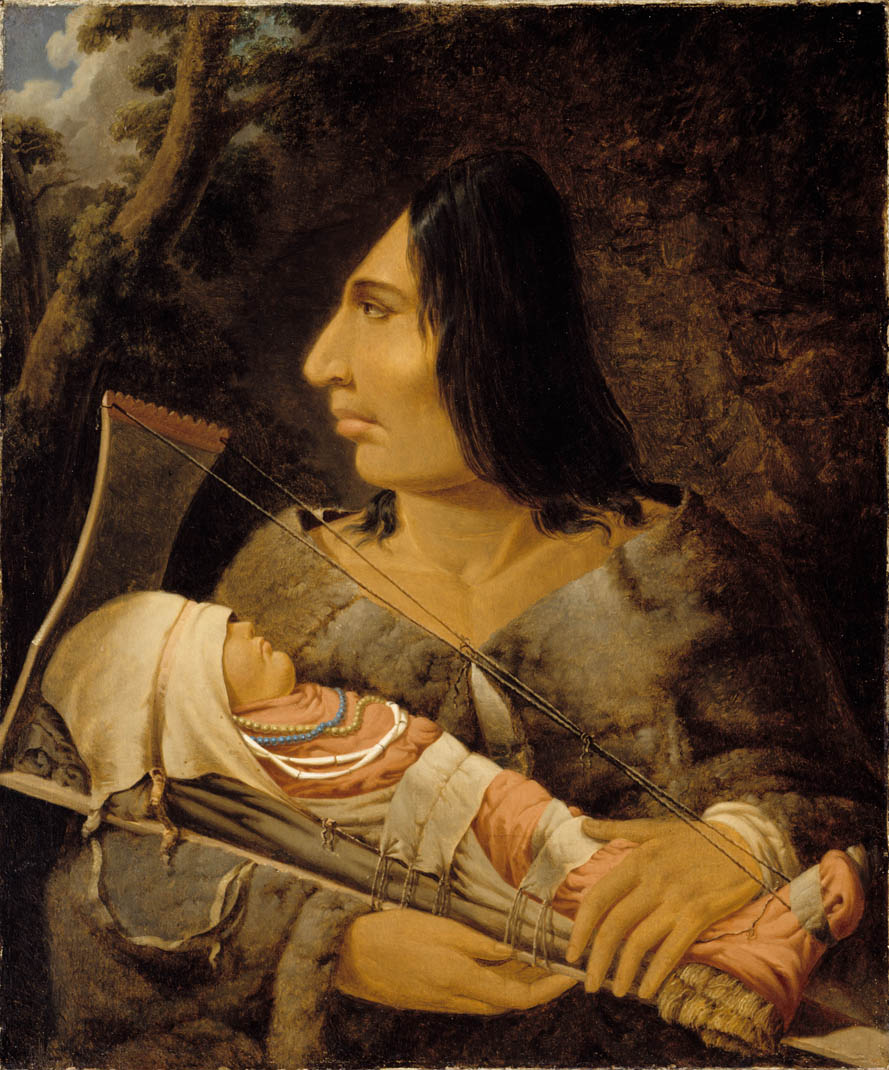
Painting by Paul Kane, showing a Chinookan child in the process of having their head flattened, and an adult after the process

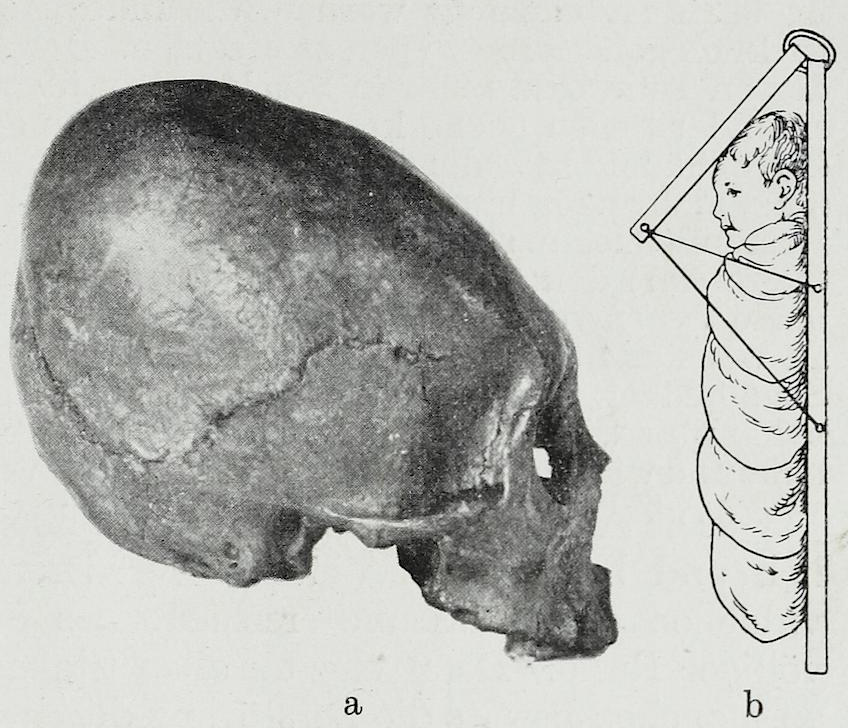
An anatomical illustration from the 1921 German edition of Anatomie des Menschen: ein Lehrbuch für Studierende und Ärzte with Latin terminology

== Motivations and theories ==
According to one modern theory, cranial deformation was likely performed to signify group affiliation or to demonstrate social status. Such motivations may have played a key role in Maya society, aimed at creating a skull shape that is aesthetically more pleasing or associated with desirable cultural attributes. For example, in the Na'ahai-speaking area of Tomman Island and the south-southwestern Malakulan (Australasia), a person with an elongated head is thought to be more intelligent, of higher status, and closer to the world of the spirits.

Historically, there have been various theories regarding the motivations for these practices.

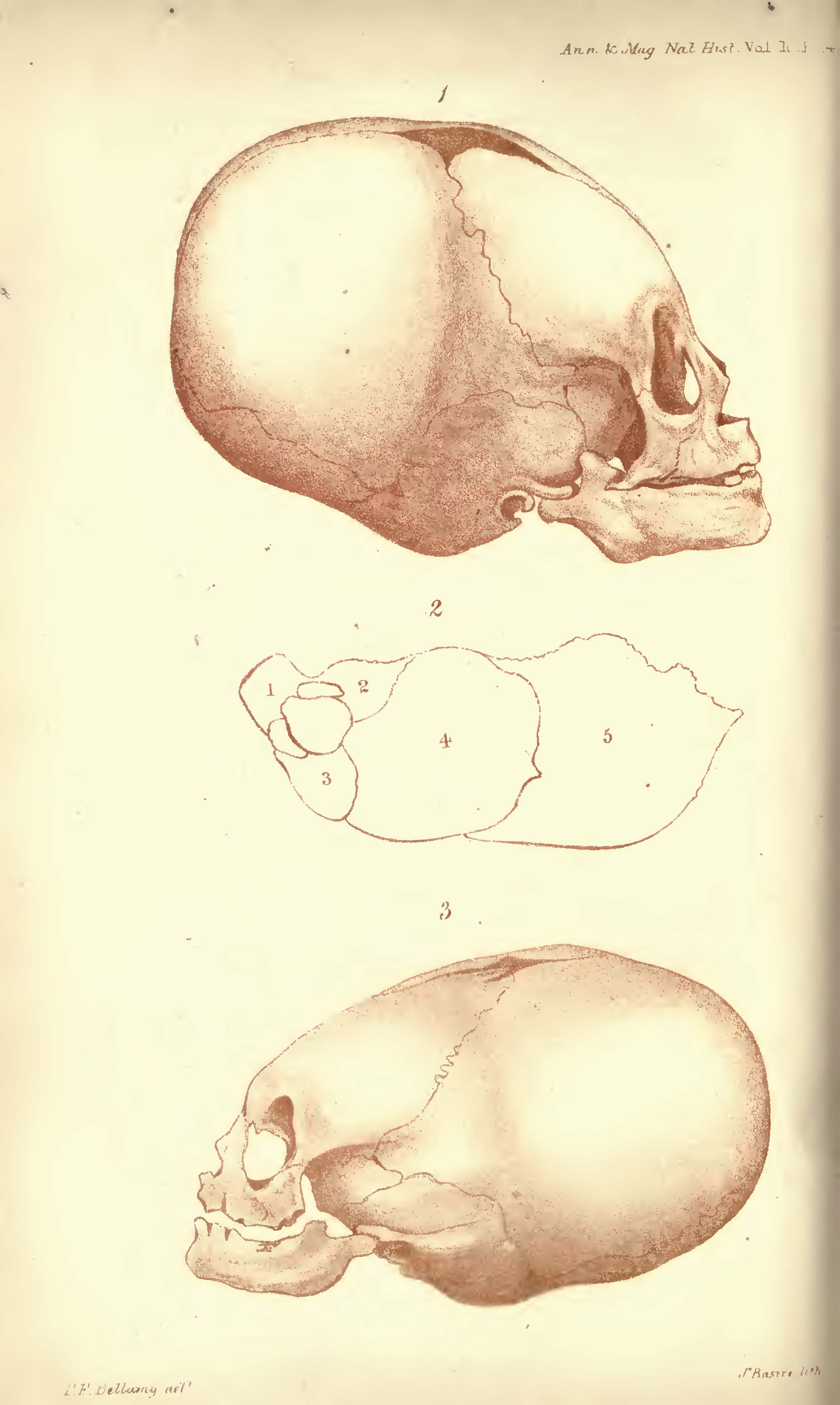
Lithographs of skulls by J. Basire

It has also been suggested that the practice of cranial deformation originated as an attempt to emulate groups in which an elongated head shape was a natural condition. The skulls of some ancient Egyptians are among those identified as often being naturally elongated, and macrocephaly may be a familial characteristic. For example, Rivero and Tschudi describe an Inca mummy containing a fetus with an elongated skull, describing it thus:

the same formation [i.e., absence of the signs of artificial pressure] of the head presents itself in children yet unborn; and of this truth we have had convincing proof in the sight of a foetus, enclosed in the womb of a mummy of a pregnant woman, which we found in a cave of Huichay, two leagues from Tarma, and which is, at this moment, in our collection. Professor d'Outrepont, of great Celebrity in the department of obstetrics, has assured us that the foetus is one of seven months' age. It belongs, according to a very clearly defined formation of the cranium, to the tribe of the Huancas. We present the reader with a drawing of this conclusive and interesting proof in opposition to the advocates of mechanical action as the sole and exclusive cause of the phrenological form of the Peruvian race.

P. F. Bellamy makes a similar observation about two elongated skulls of infants, which were discovered and brought to England by a "Captain Blankley" and handed over to the Museum of the Devon and Cornwall Natural History Society in 1838. According to Bellamy, these skulls belonged to two infants, female and male, "one of which was not more than a few months old, and the other could not be much more than one year." He writes:

It will be manifest from the general contour of these skulls that they are allied to those in the Museum of the College of Surgeons in London, denominated Titicacans. Those adult skulls are very generally considered to be distorted by the effects of pressure; but in opposition to this opinion Dr. Graves has stated that "a careful examination of them has convinced him that their peculiar shape cannot be owing to artificial pressure;" and to corroborate this view, we may remark that the peculiarities are as great in the child as in the adult, and indeed more in the younger than in the elder of the two specimens now produced: and the position is considerably strengthened by the great relative length of the large bones of the cranium; by the direction of the plane of the occipital bone, which is not forced upwards, but occupies a place in the under part of the skull; by the further absence of marks of pressure, there being no elevation of the vertex nor projection of either side; and by the fact of there being no instrument nor mechanical contrivance suited to produce such an alteration of form (as these skulls present) found in connection with them.

== Health effects ==
There is no statistically significant difference in cranial capacity between artificially deformed skulls and normal skulls in Peruvian samples.

However, cranial modification can lead to strong cranial and facial asymmetry. The practice can also cause bleedings, infections and necrosis of the compressed areas. After infancy, the effects of cranial deformation are progressively lost, and the body partially compensates to the shape imposed during childhood through adaptive compensatory growth.

== See also ==
- Foot binding
- Plagiocephaly
