= Macrocephali =

Ancient tribe of Africans or Indians who performed artificial cranial deformation

The Macrocephali (Ancient Greek: Μακροκέφαλοι; "long-headed people") were ancient tribes living near the Black Sea who performed artificial cranial deformation.

Pliny the Elder, Pomponius Mela, Scylax, and Hippocrates all mention a people specifically by this name living northeast of Pontus. While other writers, such as Strabo and the author of the Periplus of the Euxine Sea, identify the Macrocephali with the Macrones, Pliny clearly considers them separate groups. The Macrocephali were also treated as a mythical species on the same level as the Cynocephaly, Pygmies, and Skiapodes. In book 3 of Philostratus's Life of Apollonius, an Indian monk named Iarchas refutes the existence of all such creatures found in the books of Scylax besides the Pygmies.

Dr. Heinrich Rathke writes about elongated skulls being found in northern Caucasus during the early 1800s which he attributes to the Macrocephali. Indentations in the bone show that the skulls had been bound by clothes to change the shape. A drawing of such skulls was also on display at a museum in Kerch as of 1842.

Their cultural practice of artificially elongating the skulls of their children is mentioned in part 14 of Hippocrates' On Air, Water, and Places. It is described how, soon after birth while a child's head is still soft, it would be bound to increase its length. Hippocrates claimed that this was done because the Macrocephali equated head length to nobleness. However, even in his own writing, Hippocrates mentions that the practice is falling out of use due to interactions with other peoples.

Juan Huarte wrote that the Macrocephali had heads like a sugar-loaf, in which the top was extended. His work claimed that due to the practice being done so often children were being born with naturally elongated heads. Something which Hippocrates believed should have been happening but ultimately dismissed.

Strabo mentions that the Siginni (Σίγιννοι), a barbaric tribe living near the Caucasus Mountains, deliberately altered the shape of their heads appear longer by having foreheads which protruded past their chin. The Siginni were however considered to be a different tribe than the Macrocephali or Macrones (whom he called Sanni) by Strabo.
