= Josef Servas d'Outrepont =

Josef Servas d'Outrepont; name also given as Joseph Servatius von d'Outrepont (21 November 1775 – 8 May 1845) was a German obstetrician born in Malmedy.

He studied medicine at the universities of Mainz, Würzburg and Halle, earning his doctorate at the latter institution in 1798. Afterwards, he continued his education in Vienna under Johann Lucas Boër (1751–1835), and in 1799 settled in Salzburg, where in 1804 he became an associate professor of obstetrics.

In 1816 he moved to Munich, where he gave classes at the school for midwifery, and soon afterwards succeeded Adam Elias von Siebold (1775–1828) as professor of obstetrics at the University of Würzburg. Here he remained until his death in 1845. He made scholarly contributions to a number of medical journals, including the Neue Zeitschrift für Geburtskunde, and was the author of the following books in obstetrics:

- Von der Selbstwendung und der Wendung auf den Kopf, (1817).
- Abhandlungen und Beiträge geburtshilflichen Inhalts, (1822) – Essays and contributions of obstetric content.
- Publications about Joseph d'Outrepont:
- Joseph Servatius von d'Outrepont. Ein Lebensbild by Georg Burckhard (1913).
