= Afrasiab Museum of Samarkand =

Museum and historic site in Samarkand, Uzbekistan

Coordinates: 39.6693°N 66.9934°E

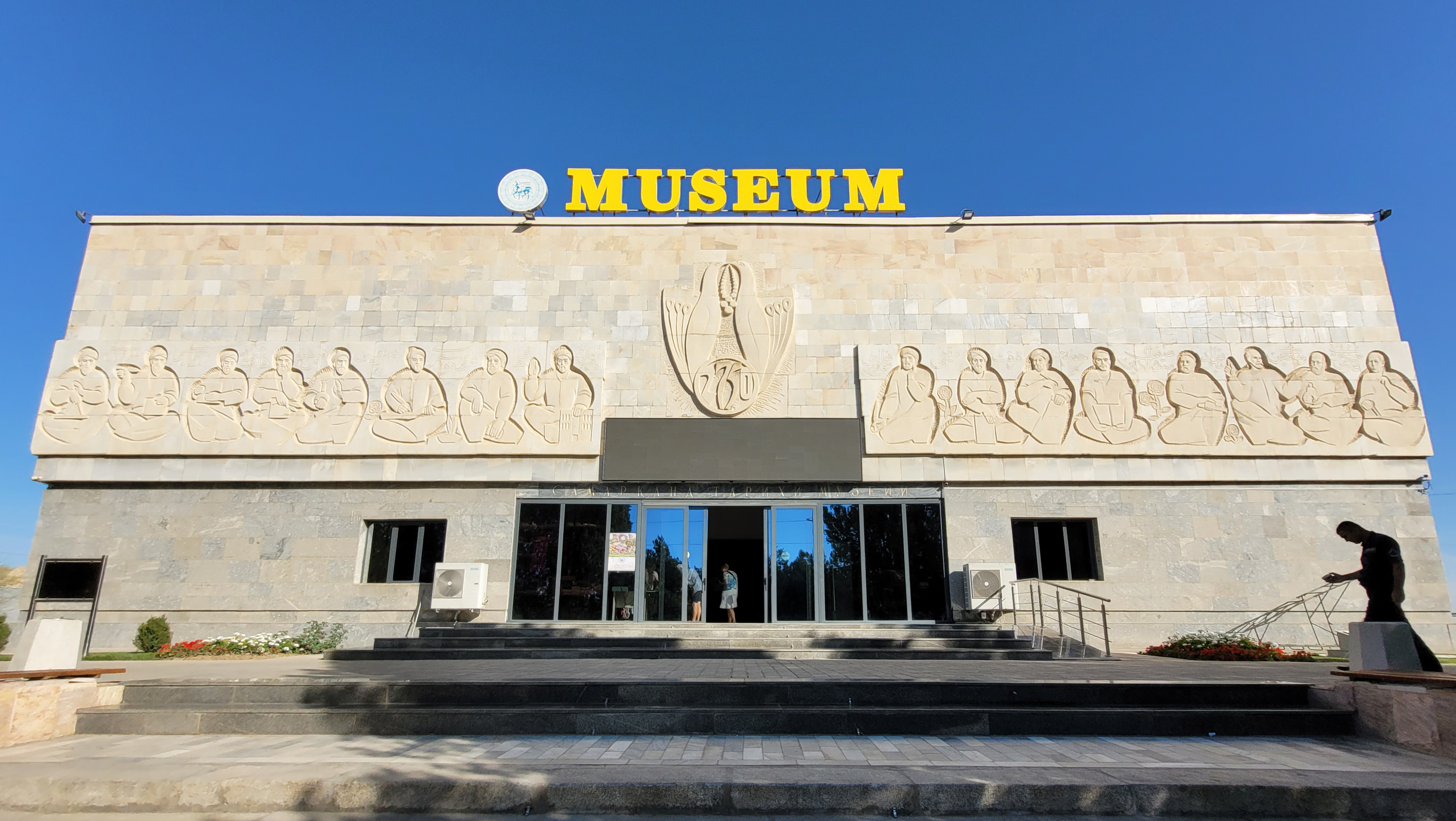
- Main building of the Afrasiab Museum of Samarkand

- Location within West and Central Asia Location within Uzbekistan
- Established: 1970
- Location: Samarkand, Uzbekistan
- Type: History museum, Historic site

The Afrasiab Museum of Samarkand (Uzbek: Afrosiyob-Samarqand shahar tarixi muzeyi) is a museum located at the historical site of Afrasiyab, one of the largest archaeological sites in the world and an ancient city that was destroyed by the Mongols in the early 13th century. The museum building and archaeological site are located in the north-eastern part of the city of Samarkand in the Central Asian country of Uzbekistan. They bear the name of Afrasiab, the mythical king and hero of Turan. The permanent exhibition at the museum is focused on the history of the city and the surrounding region. The museum building was designed by Armenian architect Bagdasar Arzumanyan in 1970, when the Uzbek Soviet Socialist Republic was part of the Soviet Union. The opening of the museum was dedicated to the 2500th anniversary of the founding of Samarkand. Thematically, the museum is divided into five rooms dedicated to different periods of life in the fort of Afrasiyab.

The museum was conceived as a place to share the story about the founding of Samarkand, its subsequent history, and the settlement of Afrasiyab. It features exhibits of artifacts found during excavations in Afrasiyab and Samarkand and the wider region. Among the artifacts are the remains of ancient swords, ossuaries, knives and other sharp objects, arrows, coins, ceramics, ancient manuscripts and books, statues, and other ancient objects of everyday life. The exposition consists of more than 22,000 unique exhibits. A notable exhibit is the uniquely preserved Afrasiab murals of Samarkand palace from the Ikhshid Dynasty of the 7th-8th centuries.

In December 2015, as a part of a cultural cooperation project between Uzbekistan and Azerbaijan, an Azerbaijani pavilion was opened at the Afrasiab Museum. The Azerbaijani Pavilion exhibits objects related to the history and culture of Azerbaijan, samples of material culture, national dress including hats and kalaghai, and books about the culture and the Azerbaijani carpet weaving traditions.

== Artifacts ==
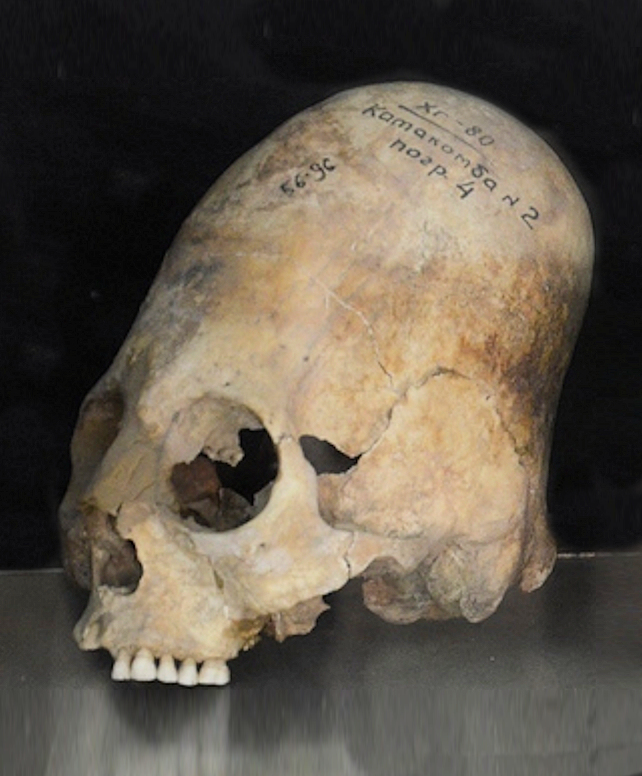
Elongated skull excavated in Samarkand, 600-800 CE

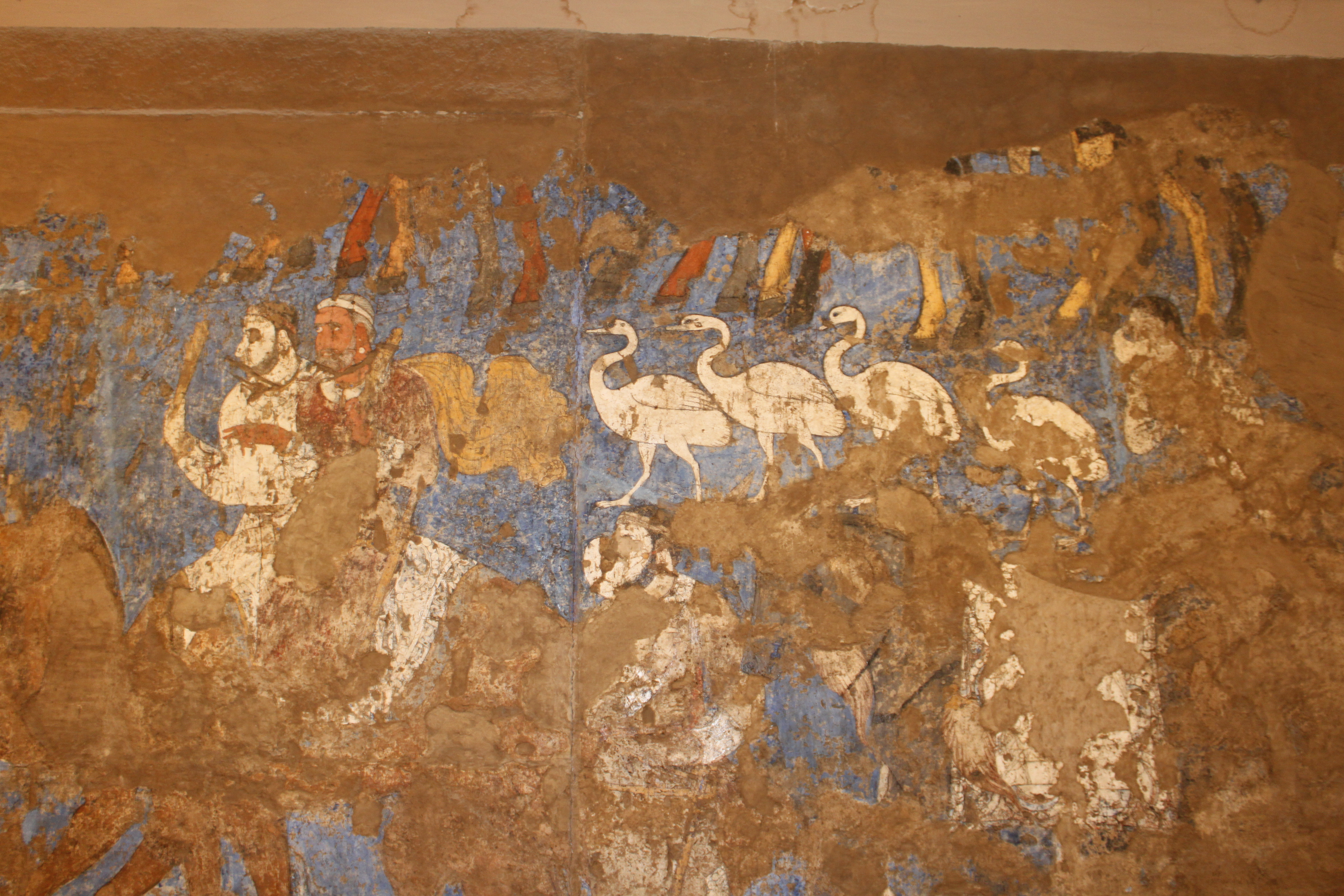
Detail of the murals, commissioned by the king of Samarkand, Varkhuman
