= Khvalynsky =

Khvalynsky (masculine), Khvalynskaya (feminine), or Khvalynskoye (neuter) may refer to:

- Khvalynsky District, a district of Saratov Oblast, Russia
- Khvalynskoye gas field, conventional gas condensate field in Kazakhstan
