= History of Central Asia =

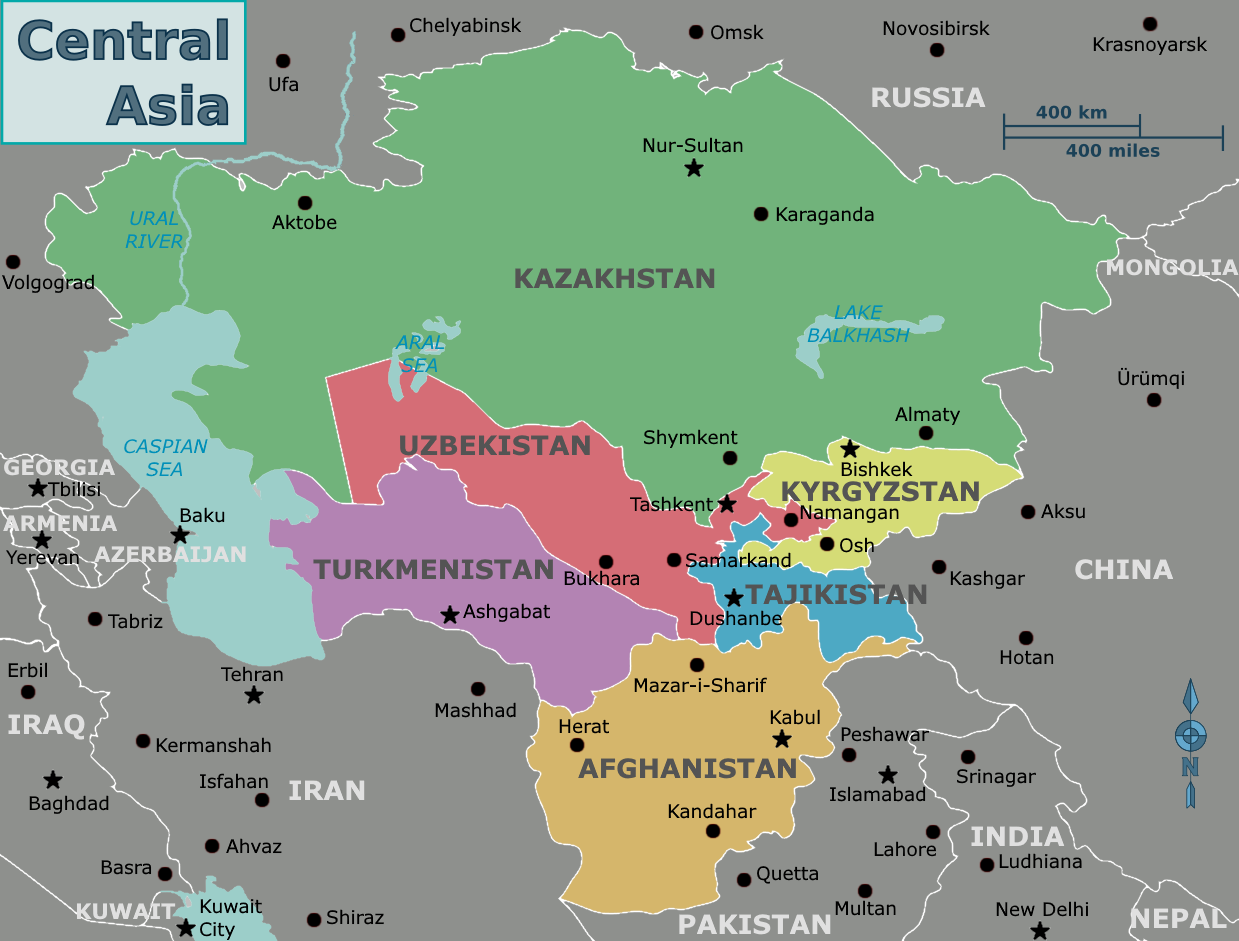
Contemporary political map of Central Asia

The history of Central Asia concerns the history of the various peoples that have inhabited Central Asia. The lifestyle of such people has been determined primarily by the area's climate and geography. The aridity of the region makes agriculture difficult and distance from the sea cut it off from much trade. Thus, few major cities developed in the region. Nomadic horse peoples of the steppe dominated the area for millennia.

Relations between the steppe nomads and the settled people in and around Central Asia were marked by conflict. The nomadic lifestyle was well-suited to warfare, and the steppe horse riders became some of the most militarily potent people in the world, due to the devastating techniques and ability of their horse archers. Periodically, tribal leaders or changing conditions would cause several tribes to organize themselves into a single military force, which would then often launch campaigns of conquest, especially into more 'civilized' areas. A few of these types of tribal coalitions included the Huns' invasion of Europe, various Turkic migrations into Transoxiana and most notably the Mongol conquest of much of Eurasia.

The dominance of the nomads ended in the 16th century as firearms allowed settled people to gain control of the region. The Russian Empire, the Qing dynasty of China, and other powers expanded into the area and seized the bulk of Central Asia by the end of the 19th century. After the Russian Revolution of 1917, the Soviet Union incorporated most of Central Asia; only Mongolia and Afghanistan remained nominally independent, although Mongolia existed as a Soviet satellite state and Soviet troops invaded Afghanistan in the late 20th century. The Soviet areas of Central Asia saw much industrialization and construction of infrastructure, but also the suppression of local cultures and a lasting legacy of ethnic tensions and environmental problems.

With the collapse of the Soviet Union in 1991, five Central Asian countries gained independence — Kazakhstan, Uzbekistan, Turkmenistan, Kyrgyzstan, and Tajikistan. In all of the new states, former communist party officials retained power as local strongmen, with the partial exception of Kyrgyzstan which, despite ousting three post-Soviet presidents in popular uprisings, has as yet been unable to consolidate a stable democracy.

== Prehistory ==
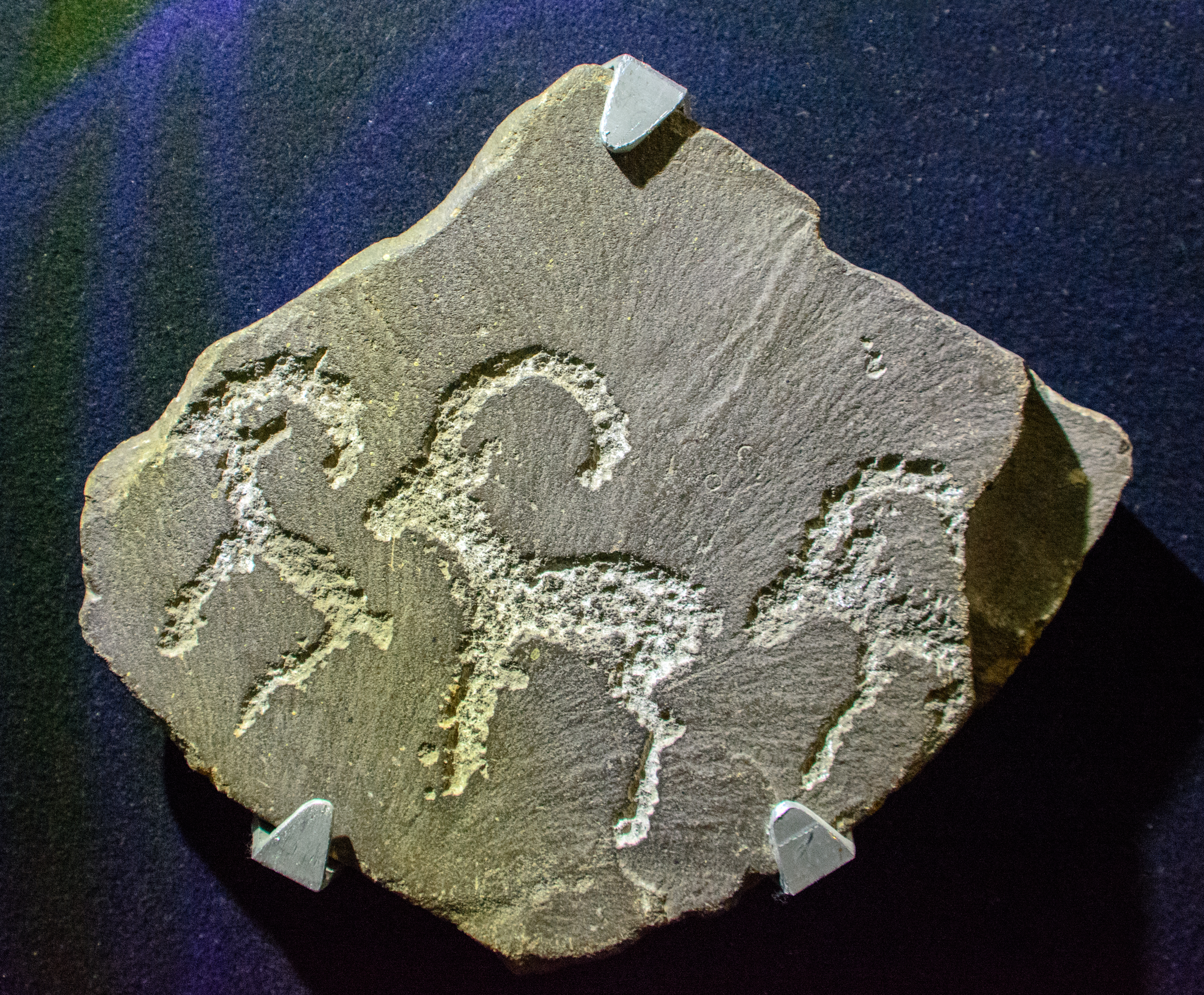
Sarmishsay (Navoi Region), Rock Art 3rd millennium BCE. State Museum of History of Uzbekistan.

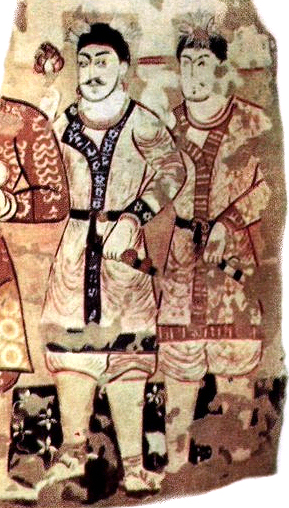
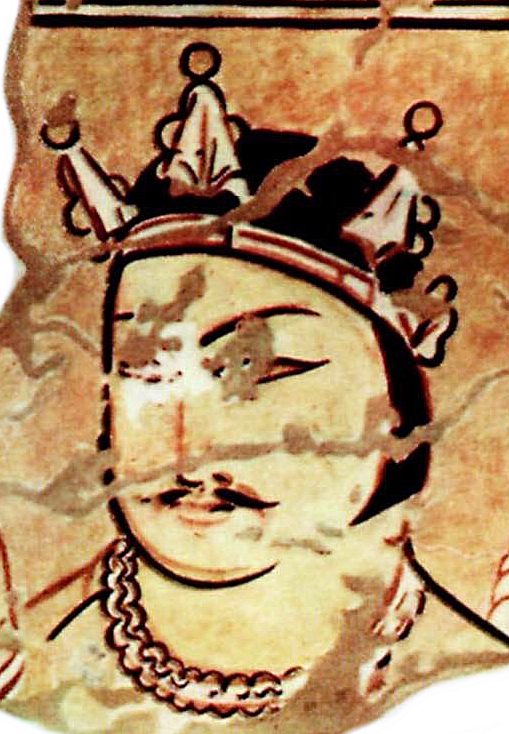
Murals from Dilberjin Tepe, thought to represent early Central Asian Huns.

Homo sapiens reached Central Asia by 50,000 to 40,000 years ago. The Tibetan Plateau is thought to have been reached by 38,000 years ago. The currently oldest modern human sample found in northern Central Asia, is a 45,000-year-old remain, which was genetically closest to ancient and modern East Asians, but his lineage died out quite early.

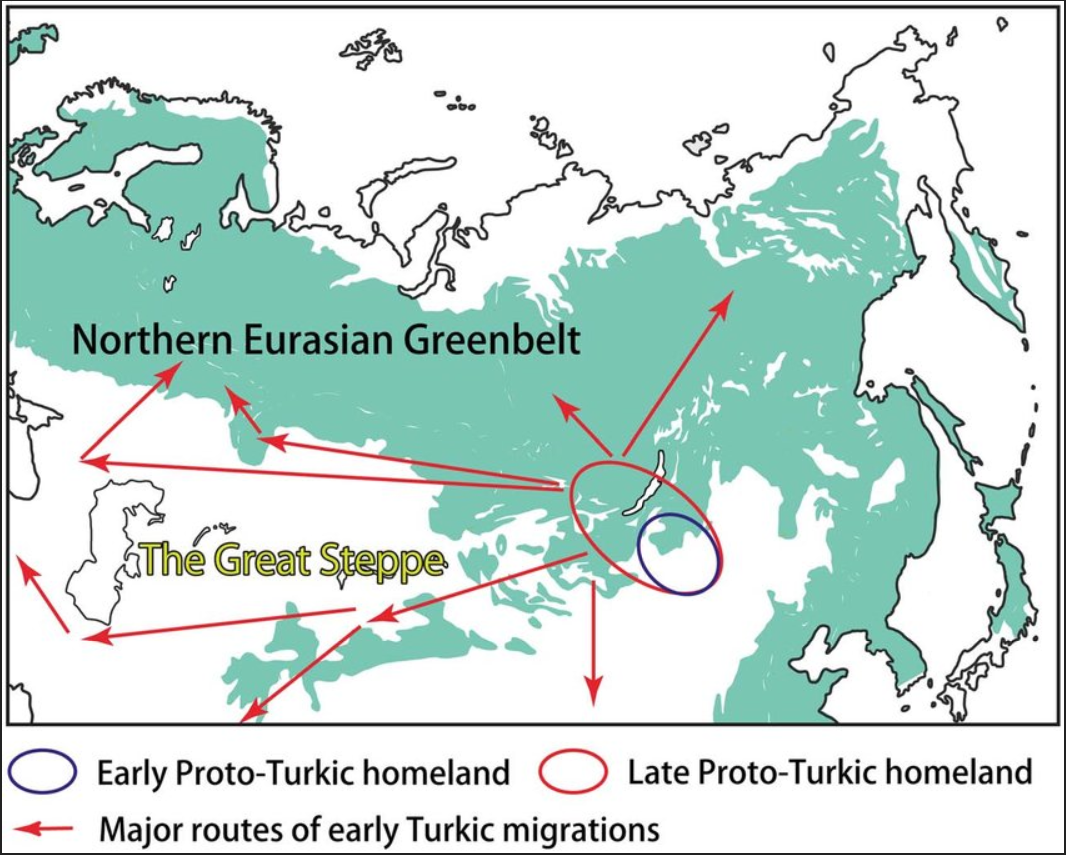
Genetic, archeologic and linguistic evidence links the early Turkic peoples to the "Northeast Asian gene pool". Proto-Turks are suggested to have adopted a nomadic lifestyle and expanded from eastern Mongolia westwards.

Paleolithic Central Asia was characterized by a distinctive but deeply European-related population (Ancient North Eurasian), with subsequent geneflow from Paleo-Siberians, contributing East Asian-related ancestry towards Paleolithic Central Asians. During the Bronze Age, ancient Central Asia received various migration events from Europe and the Middle East, associated with Indo-Europeans. Bronze Age Central Asia consisted largely of Iranian peoples, with some groups being of Paleo-Siberian and Samoyedic (Uralic) origin. Since the early Iron Age, Central Asia received noteworthy amounts of migration from East Asian-related populations, and became increasingly diverse. The Turkic peoples slowly replaced and assimilated the previous Iranian-speaking locals, turning the population of Central Asia from largely Iranian, into primarily of East Asian descent. Modern Central Asians are characterized by both West-Eurasian and East-Eurasian ancestry, with the majority being of primarily East Asian ancestry, and can be linked to expanding Turkic peoples outgoing from Mongolia and Northeast Asia.

The term Ceramic Mesolithic is used of late Mesolithic cultures of Central Asia, during the 6th to 5th millennia BC (in Russian archaeology, these cultures are described as Neolithic even though farming is absent). It is characterized by its distinctive type of pottery, with point or knob base and flared rims, manufactured by methods not used by the Neolithic farmers. The earliest manifestation of this type of pottery may be in the region around Lake Baikal in Siberia. It appears in the Elshan or Yelshanka or Samara culture on the Volga in Russia by about 7000 BC. and from there spread via the Dnieper-Donets culture to the Narva culture of the Eastern Baltic.

The Botai culture (c. 3700–3100 BC) is suggested to be the earliest culture to have domesticated the horse. The four analyzed Botai samples had about 2/3 European-related and 1/3 East Asian-related ancestry. The Botai samples also showed high affinity towards the Mal'ta boy sample in Siberia.

In the Pontic–Caspian steppe, Chalcolithic cultures develop in the second half of the 5th millennium BC, small communities in permanent settlements which began to engage in agricultural practices as well as herding. Around this time, some of these communities began the domestication of the horse. According to the Kurgan hypothesis, the north-west of the region is also considered to be the source of the root of the Indo-European languages. The horse-drawn chariot appears in the 3rd millennium BC, by 2000 BC, in the form of war chariots with spoked wheels, thus being made more maneuverable, and dominated the battlefields. The growing use of the horse, combined with the failure, roughly around 2000 BC, of the always precarious irrigation systems that had allowed for extensive agriculture in the region, gave rise and dominance of pastoral nomadism by 1000 BC, a way of life that would dominate the region for the next several millennia, giving rise to the Scythian expansion of the Iron Age.

Scattered nomadic groups maintained herds of sheep, goats, horses, and camels, and conducted annual migrations to find new pastures (a practice known as transhumance). The people lived in yurts (or gers) – tents made of hides and wood that could be disassembled and transported. Each group had several yurts, each accommodating about five people.

While the semi-arid plains were dominated by the nomads, small city-states and sedentary agrarian societies arose in the more humid areas of Central Asia. The Bactria-Margiana Archaeological Complex of the early 2nd millennium BC was the first sedentary civilization of the region, practicing irrigation farming of wheat and barley and possibly a form of writing. Bactria-Margiana probably interacted with the contemporary Bronze Age nomads of the Andronovo culture, the originators of the spoke-wheeled chariot, who lived to their north in western Siberia, Russia, and parts of Kazakhstan, and survived as a culture until the 1st millennium BC. These cultures, particularly Bactria-Margiana, have been posited as possible representatives of the hypothetical Aryan culture ancestral to the speakers of the Indo-Iranian languages (see Indo-Iranians).

Later the strongest of Sogdian city-states of the Fergana Valley rose to prominence. After the 1st century BC, these cities became home to the traders of the Silk Road and grew wealthy from this trade. The steppe nomads were dependent on these settled people for a wide array of goods that were impossible for transient populations to produce. The nomads traded for these when they could, but because they generally did not produce goods of interest to sedentary people, the popular alternative was to carry out raids.

A wide variety of people came to populate the steppes. Nomadic groups in Central Asia included the Huns and other Turks, as well as Indo-Europeans such as the Tocharians, Persians, Scythians, Saka, Yuezhi, Wusun, and others, and a number of Mongol groups. Despite these ethnic and linguistic differences, the steppe lifestyle led to the adoption of very similar culture across the region.

== Ancient era ==
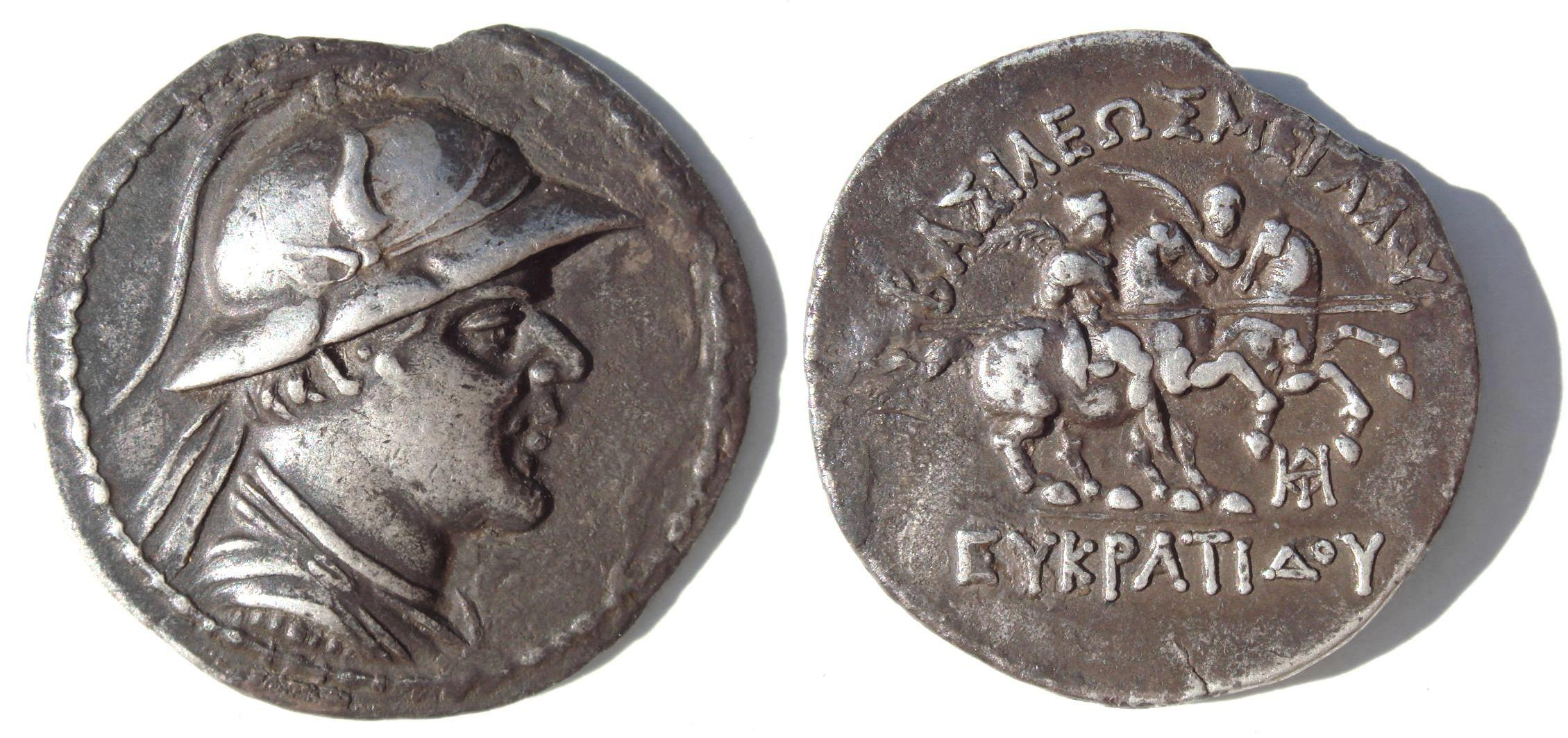
Tetradrachm of the Greco-Bactrian King Eucratides (171–145 BC).

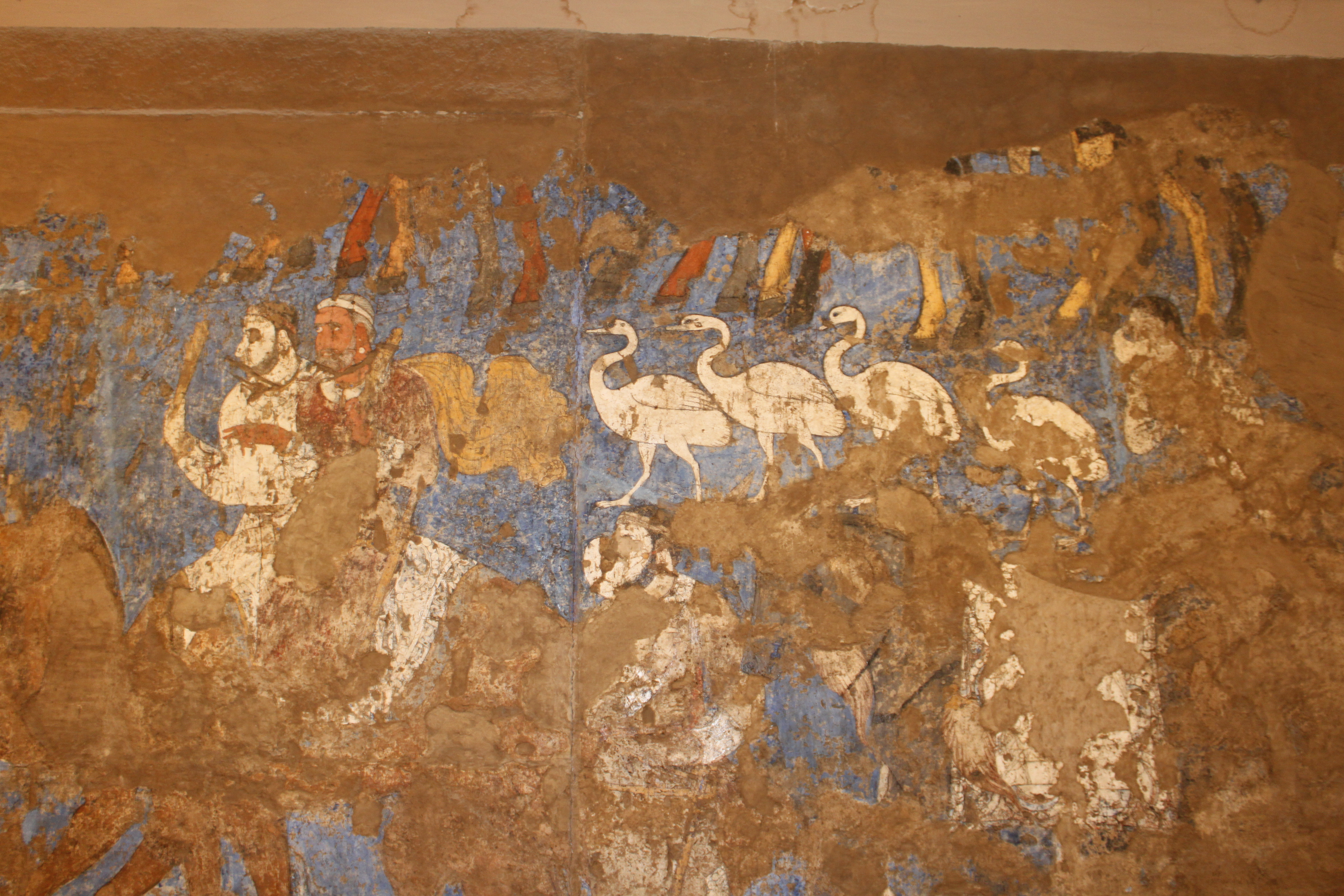
A monumental Sogdian wall mural of Samarkand, dated c. 650 AD, known as the Ambassadors' Painting, found in the hall of the ruin of an aristocratic house in Afrasiab, commissioned by the Sogdian king of Samarkand, Varkhuman

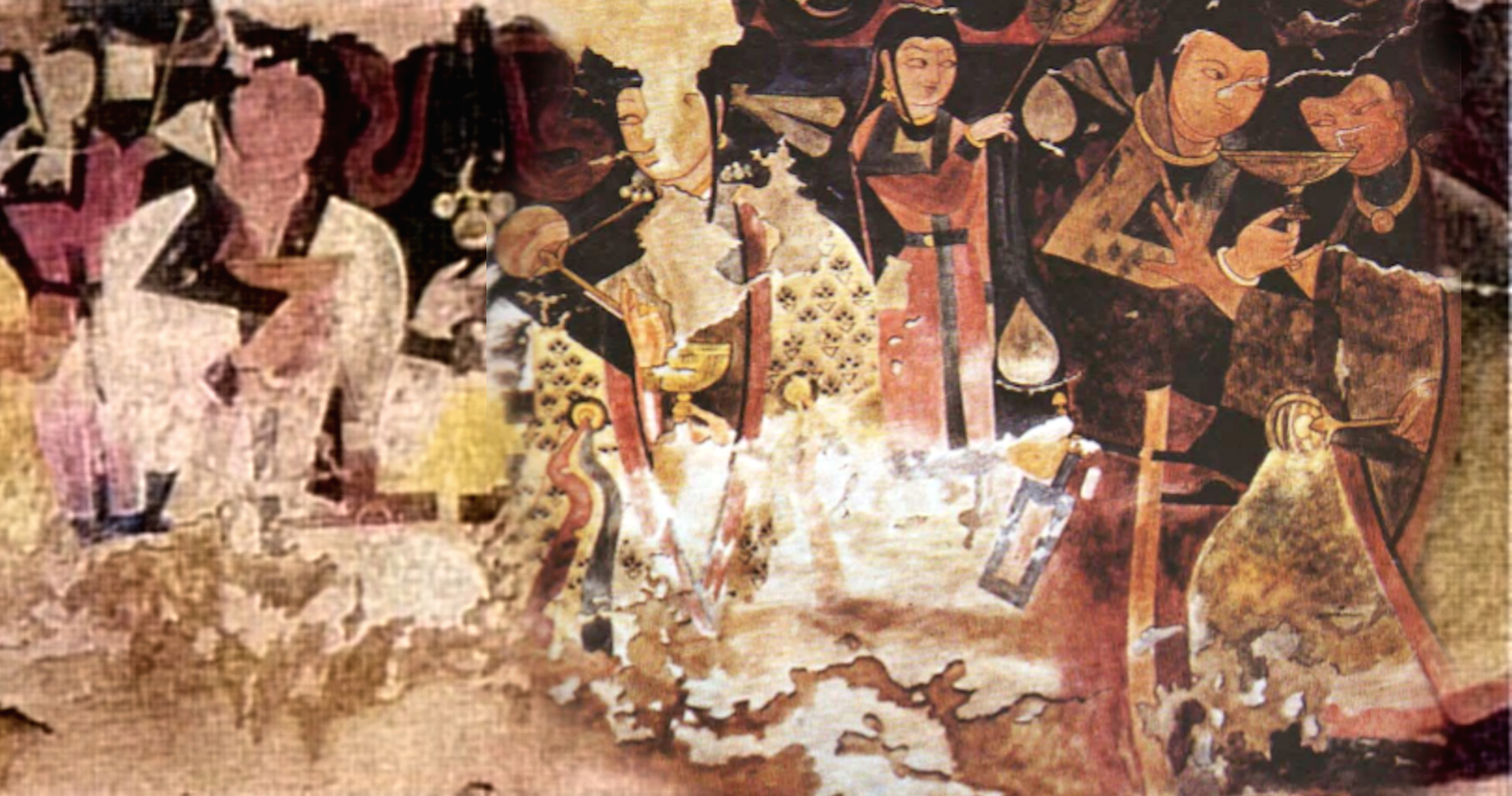
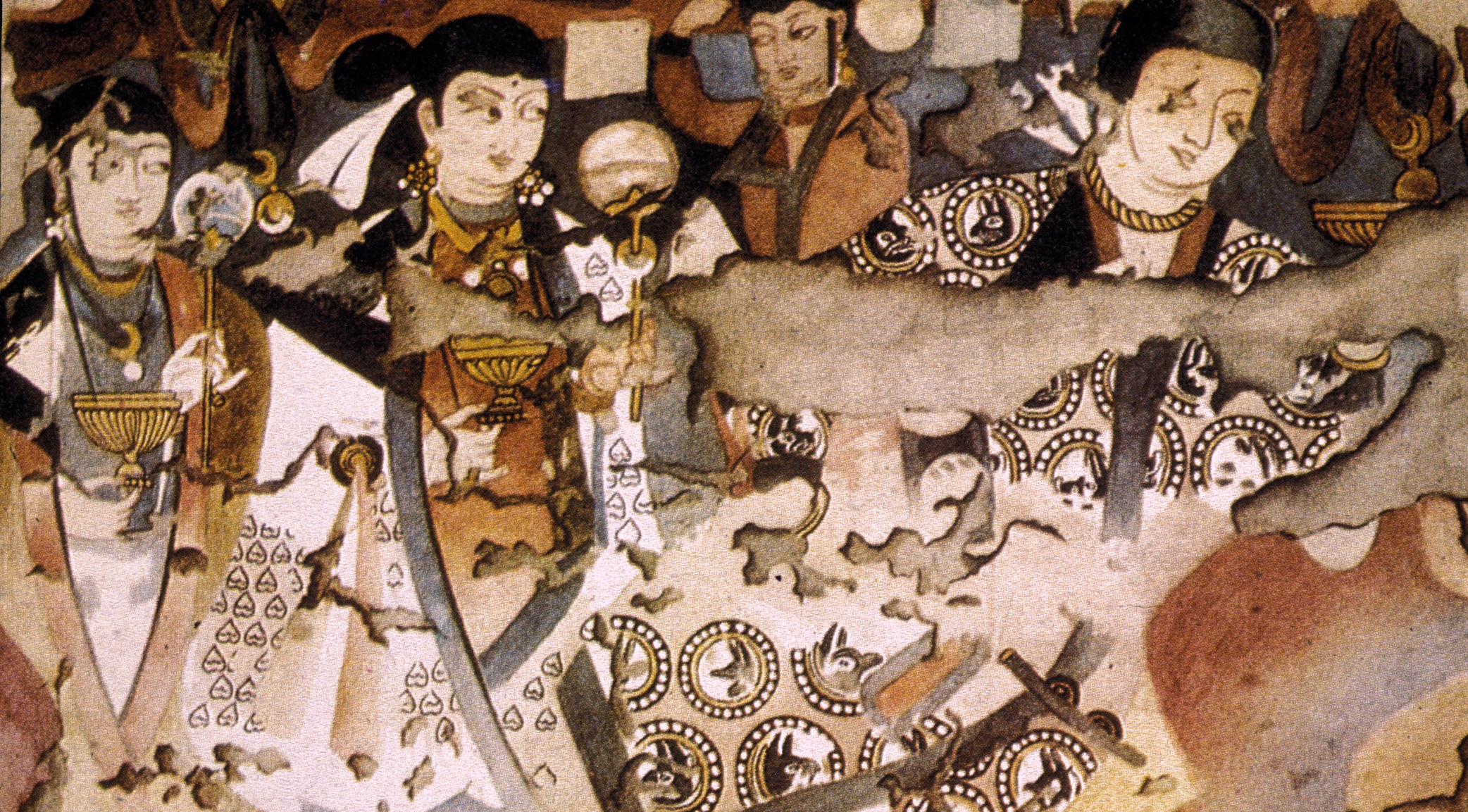
The banquet scenes in the murals of Balalyk Tepe show the life of the Hephthalite ruling class of Tokharistan.

In the 2nd and 1st millennia BC, a series of large and powerful states developed on the southern periphery of Central Asia (the Ancient Near East). These empires launched several attempts to conquer the steppe people but met with only mixed success. The Median Empire and Achaemenid Empire both ruled parts of Central Asia. The Xiongnu Empire (209 BC-93 (156) AD) may be seen as the first central Asian empire which set an example for later Göktürk and Mongol empires. Xiongnu's ancestor Xianyu tribe founded Zhongshan state (c. 6th century BC – c. 296 BC) in Hebei province, China. The title chanyu was used by the Xiongnu rulers before Modun Chanyu so it is possible that statehood history of the Xiongnu began long before Modun's rule.

Following the success of the Han–Xiongnu War, Chinese states would also regularly strive to extend their power westwards. Despite their military might, these states found it difficult to conquer the whole region.

When faced by a stronger force, the nomads could simply retreat deep into the steppe and wait for the invaders to leave. With no cities and little wealth other than the herds they took with them, the nomads had nothing they could be forced to defend. An example of this is given by Herodotus's detailed account of the futile Persian campaigns against the Scythians. The Scythians, like most nomad empires, had permanent settlements of various sizes, representing various degrees of civilisation. The vast fortified settlement of Kamenka on the Dnieper River, settled since the end of the 5th century BC, became the centre of the Scythian kingdom ruled by Ateas, who lost his life in a battle against Philip II of Macedon in 339 BC.

Some empires, such as the Persian and Macedonian empires, did make deep inroads into Central Asia by founding cities and gaining control of the trading centres. Alexander the Great's conquests spread Hellenistic civilisation all the way to Alexandria Eschate (Lit. "Alexandria the Furthest"), established in 329 BC in modern Tajikistan. After Alexander's death in 323 BC, his Central Asian territory fell to the Seleucid Empire during the Wars of the Diadochi.

In 250 BC, the Central Asian portion of the empire (Bactria) seceded as the Greco-Bactrian Kingdom, which had extensive contacts with India and China until its end in 125 BC. The Indo-Greek Kingdom, mostly based in the Punjab region but controlling a fair part of Afghanistan, pioneered the development of Greco-Buddhism. The Kushan Kingdom thrived across a wide swath of the region from the 2nd century BC to the 4th century AD, and continued Hellenistic and Buddhist traditions. These states prospered from their position on the Silk Road linking China and Europe.

Likewise, in eastern Central Asia, the Chinese Han dynasty expanded into the region at the height of its imperial power. From roughly 115 to 60 BC, Han forces fought the Xiongnu over control of the oasis city-states in the Tarim Basin. The Han was eventually victorious and established the Protectorate of the Western Regions in 60 BC, which dealt with the region's defence and foreign affairs. Chinese rule in Tarim Basin was replaced successively with Kushans and Hephthalites.

Later, external powers such as the Sassanid Empire would come to dominate this trade. One of those powers, the Parthian Empire, was of Central Asian origin, but adopted Persian-Greek cultural traditions. This is an early example of a recurring theme of Central Asian history: occasionally nomads of Central Asian origin would conquer the kingdoms and empires surrounding the region, but quickly merge into the culture of the conquered peoples.

At this time Central Asia was a heterogeneous region with a mixture of cultures and religions. Buddhism remained the largest religion, but was concentrated in the east. Around Persia, Zoroastrianism became important. Nestorian Christianity entered the area, but was never more than a minority faith. More successful was Manichaeism, which became the third largest faith.

Turkic expansion began in the 6th century; the Turkic speaking Uyghurs were one of many distinct cultural groups brought together by the trade of the Silk Route at Turfan, which was then ruled by China's Tang dynasty. The Uyghurs, primarily pastoral nomads, observed a number of religions including Manichaeism, Buddhism, and Nestorian Christianity. Many of the artefacts from this period were found in the 19th century in this remote desert region.

== Medieval ==
=== Sui and early Tang dynasty ===
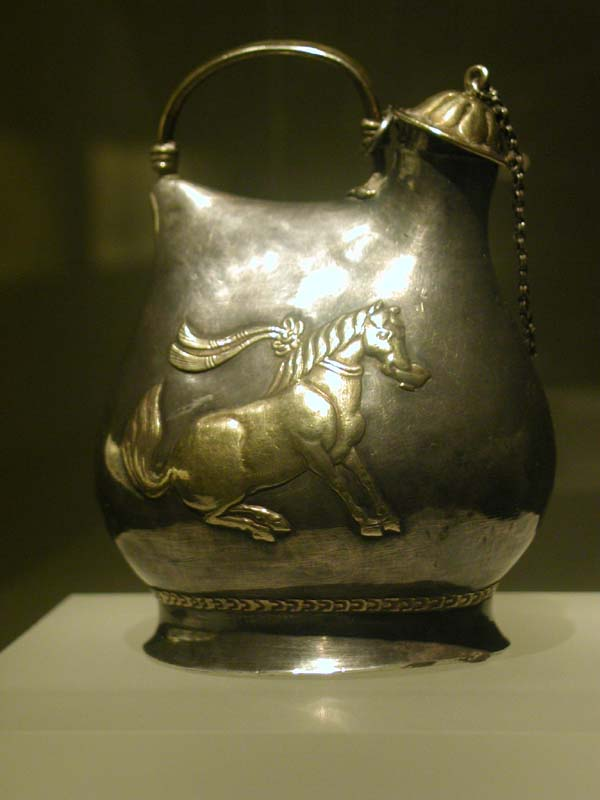
A Tang period gilt-silver jar, shaped in the style of northern nomad's leather bag decorated with a horse dancing with a cup of wine in its mouth, as the horses of Emperor Xuanzong were trained to do.

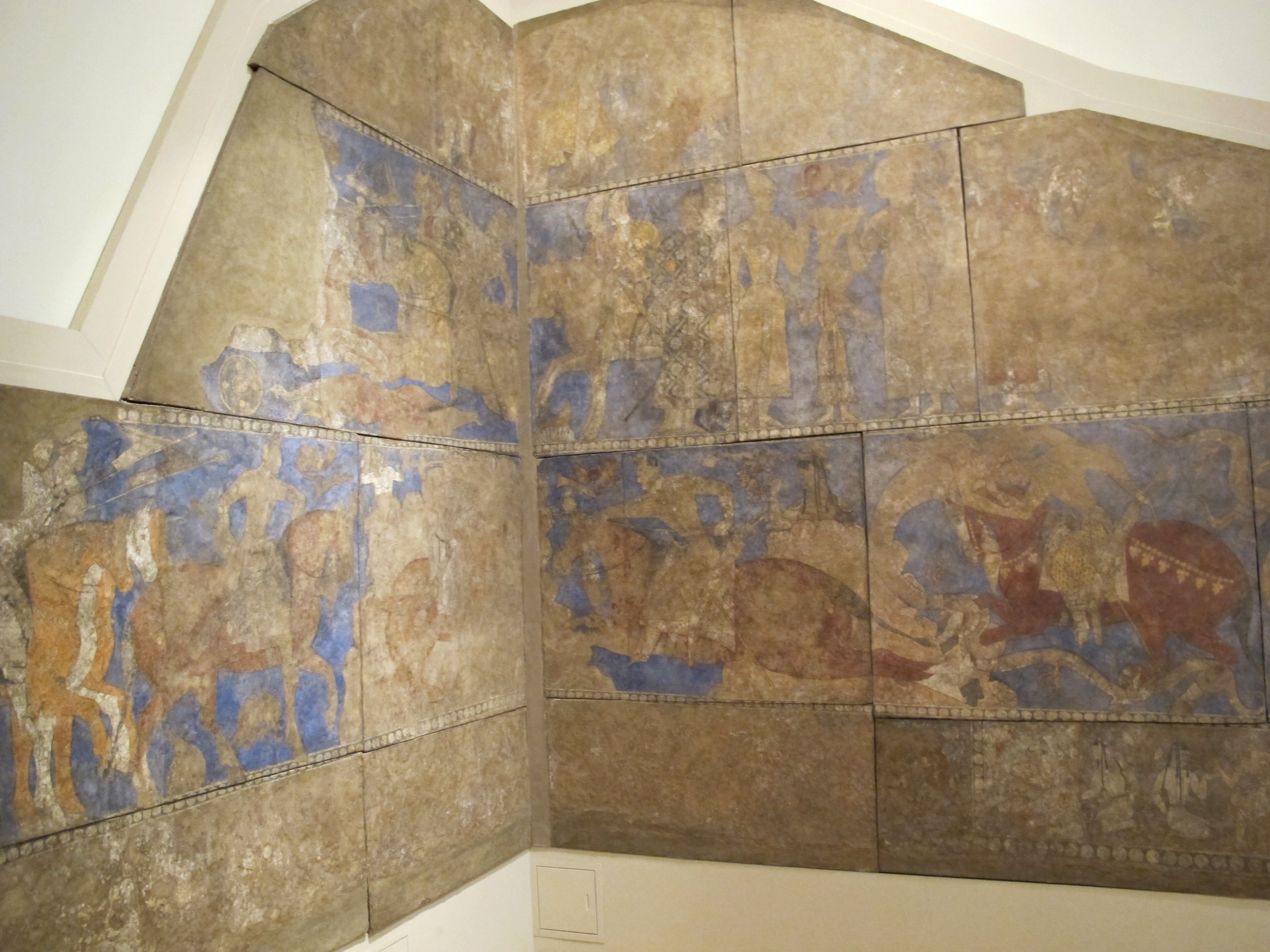
The monumental Sogdian wall murals of Panjakent (modern Tajikistan), showing cavalry and horse riders, dated c. 740 AD

It was during the Sui and Tang dynasties that China expanded into eastern Central Asia. Chinese foreign policy to the north and west now had to deal with Turkic nomads, who were becoming the most dominant ethnic group in Central Asia. To handle and avoid any threats posed by the Turks, the Sui government repaired fortifications and received their trade and tribute missions. They sent royal princesses off to marry Turkic clan leaders, a total of four of them in 597, 599, 614, and 617. The Sui army intervened in Turks' civil war and stirred conflict amongst ethnic groups against the Turks.

As early as the Sui dynasty, the Turks had become a major militarised force employed by the Chinese. When the Khitans began raiding northeast China in 605, a Chinese general led 20,000 Turks against them, distributing Khitan livestock and women to the Turks as a reward. On two occasions between 635 and 636, Tang royal princesses were married to Turk mercenaries or generals in Chinese service.

Throughout the Tang dynasty until the end of 755, there were approximately ten Turkic generals serving under the Tang. While most of the Tang army was made of fubing(府兵) Chinese conscripts, the majority of the troops led by Turkic generals were of non-Chinese origin, campaigning largely in the western frontier where the presence of fubing(府兵) troops was low. Some "Turkic" troops were nomadisized Han Chinese, a desinicized people.

Civil war in China was almost totally diminished by 626, along with the defeat in 628 of the Ordos Chinese warlord Liang Shidu; after these internal conflicts, the Tang began an offensive against the Turks. In the year 630, Tang armies captured areas of the Ordos Desert, modern-day Inner Mongolia province, and southern Mongolia from the Turks.

After this military victory, Emperor Taizong won the title of Great Khan amongst the various Turks in the region who pledged their allegiance to him and the Chinese empire (with several thousand Turks traveling into China to live at Chang'an). On June 11, 631, Emperor Taizong also sent envoys to the Eastern Turkic tribes bearing gold and silk in order to persuade the release of enslaved Chinese prisoners who were captured during the transition from Sui to Tang from the northern frontier; this embassy succeeded in freeing 80,000 Chinese men and women who were then returned to China.

While the Turks were settled in the Ordos region (former territory of the Xiongnu), the Tang government took on the military policy of dominating the central steppe. Like the earlier Han dynasty, the Tang dynasty, along with Turkic allies like the Uyghurs, conquered and subdued Central Asia during the 640s and 650s. During Emperor Taizong's reign alone, large campaigns were launched against not only the Göktürks, but also separate campaigns against the Tuyuhun, and the Xueyantuo. Taizong also launched campaigns against the oasis states of the Tarim Basin, beginning with the annexation of Gaochang in 640. The nearby kingdom of Karasahr was captured by the Tang in 644 and the kingdom of Kucha was conquered in 649.

The expansion into Central Asia continued under Taizong's successor, Emperor Gaozong, who invaded the Western Turks ruled by the qaghan Ashina Helu in 657 with an army led by Su Dingfang. Ashina was defeated and the khaganate was absorbed into the Tang Empire. The territory was administered through the Anxi Protectorate and the Four Garrisons of Anxi. Tang hegemony beyond the Pamir Mountains in Afghanistan ended with revolts by the Turks in 665, but the Tang retained a military presence in Kyrgyzstan, Tajikistan, Uzbekistan, and Kazakhstan. These holdings were later invaded by the Tibetan Empire to the south in 670.

=== Tang rivalry with the Tibetan Empire ===
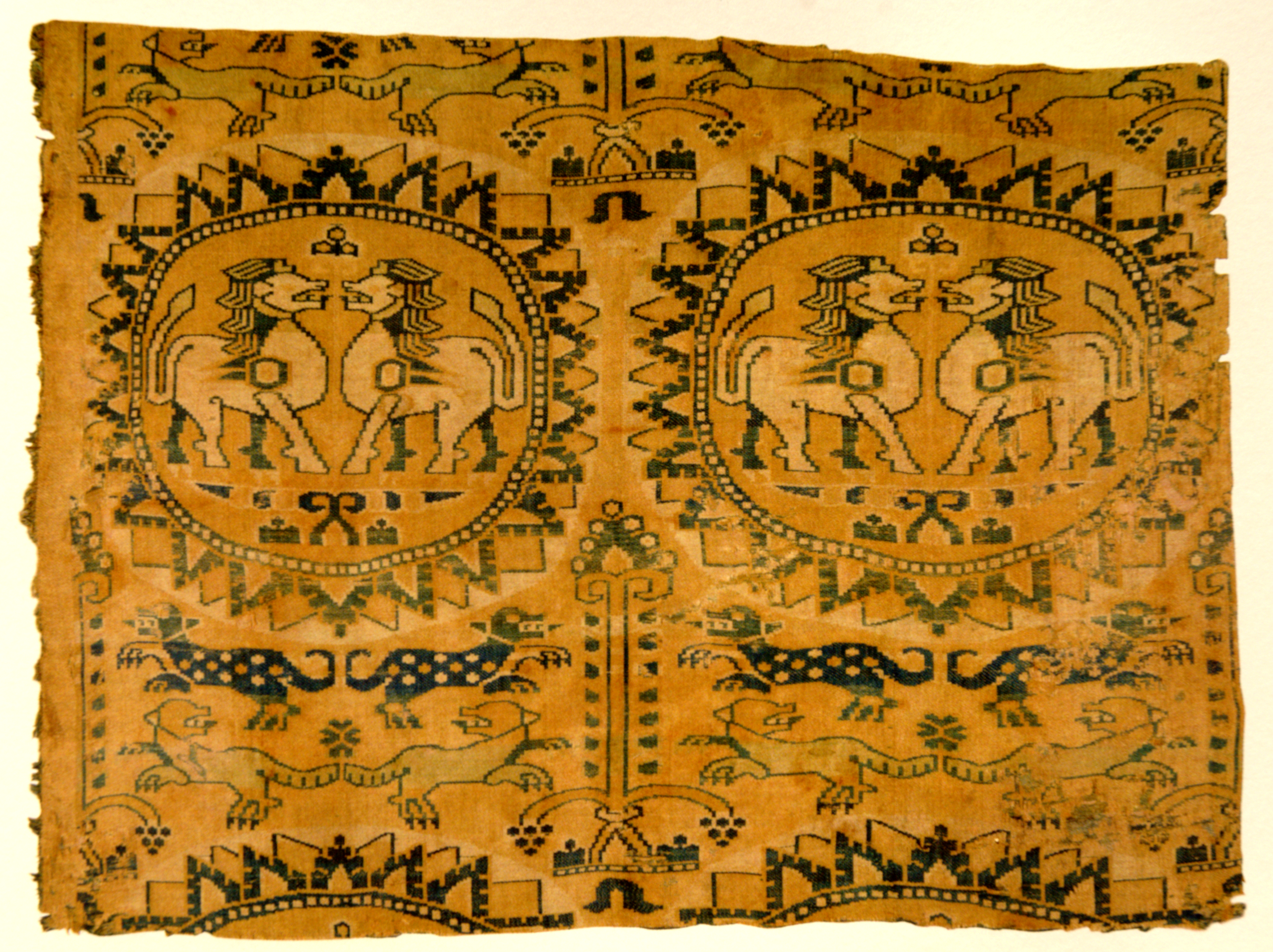
A lion motif on Sogdian polychrome silk, 8th century AD, most likely from Bukhara

The Tang Empire competed with the Tibetan Empire for control of areas in Inner and Central Asia, which was at times settled with marriage alliances such as the marrying of Princess Wencheng (d. 680) to Songtsän Gampo (d. 649). A Tibetan tradition mentions that after Songtsän Gampo's death in 649 AD, Chinese troops captured Lhasa. The Tibetan scholar Tsepon W. D. Shakabpa believes that the tradition is in error and that "those histories reporting the arrival of Chinese troops are not correct" and claims that the event is mentioned neither in the Chinese annals nor in the manuscripts of Dunhuang.

There was a long string of conflicts with Tibet over territories in the Tarim Basin between 670–692 and in 763 the Tibetans even captured the capital of China, Chang'an, for fifteen days during the An Shi Rebellion. In fact, it was during this rebellion that the Tang withdrew its western garrisons stationed in what is now Gansu and Qinghai, which the Tibetans then occupied along with the territory of Central Asia. Hostilities between the Tang and Tibet continued until they signed a formal peace treaty in 821. The terms of this treaty, including the fixed borders between the two countries, are recorded in a bilingual inscription on a stone pillar outside the Jokhang temple in Lhasa.

=== Arrival of Islam ===
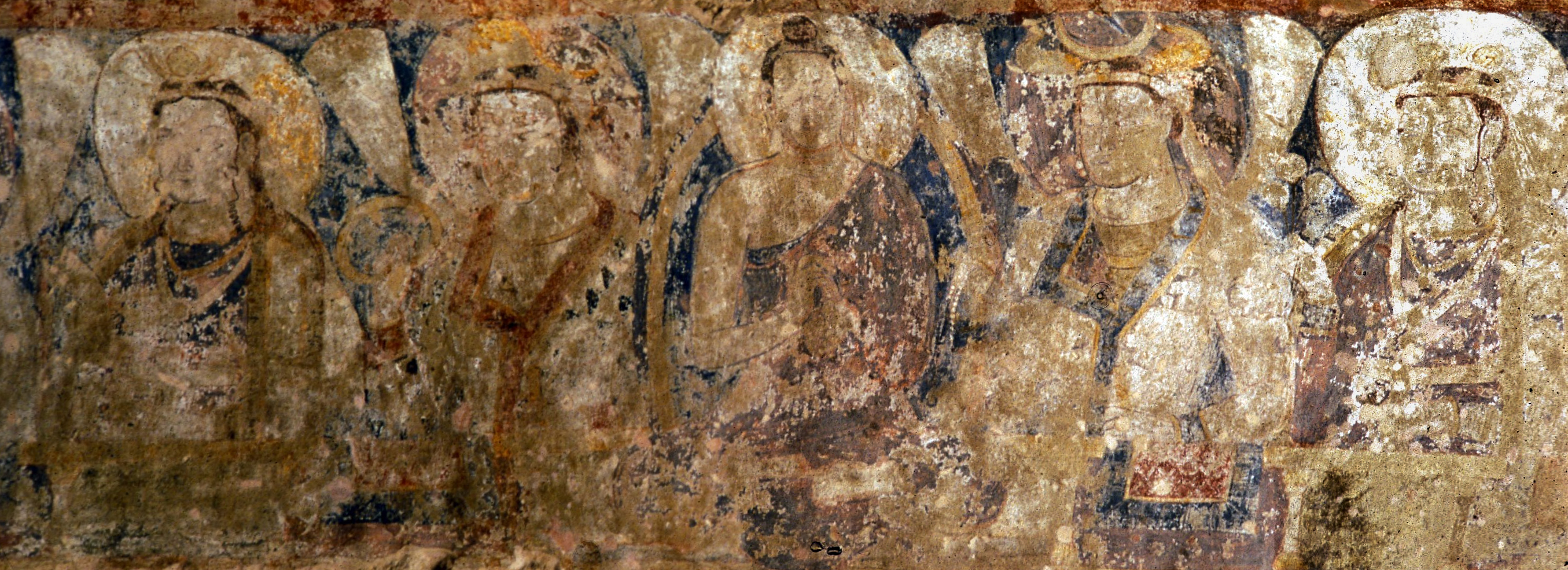
Pre-Islamic Buddhist paintings at Bamyan, Afghanistan.

In the 8th century, Islam began to penetrate the region: the desert nomads of Arabia could militarily match the nomads of the steppe, and the Umayyad Caliphate gained control over parts of Central Asia. The early conquests under Qutayba ibn Muslim (705–715) were soon reversed by a combination of native uprisings and invasion by the Türgesh, but the collapse of the Türgesh Khaganate after 738 opened the way for the re-imposition of Muslim authority under Nasr ibn Sayyar.

The Arab invasion also saw Chinese influence expelled from western Central Asia. At the Battle of Talas in 751 an Arab army decisively defeated a Tang force, and for the next several centuries Middle Eastern influences would dominate the region. Large-scale Islamization however did not begin until the 9th century, running parallel with the fragmentation of Abbasid political authority and the emergence of local Iranian and Turkic dynasties like the Samanids.

== Steppe empires ==
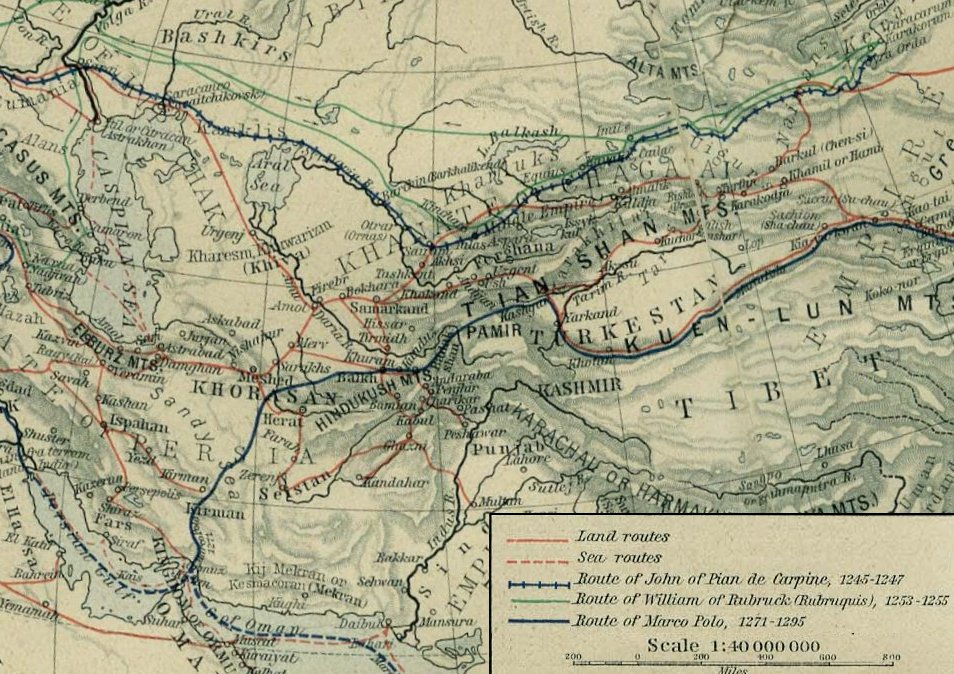
A map showing the major trade routes of Central Asia in the 13th century.

Mongol invasions and conquests seriously depopulated large areas of Muslim Central Asia

Over time, as new technologies were introduced, the nomadic horsemen grew in power. The Scythians developed the saddle, and by the time of the Alans the use of the stirrup had begun. Horses continued to grow larger and sturdier so that chariots were no longer needed as the horses could carry men with ease. This greatly increased the mobility of the nomads; it also freed their hands, allowing them to use the bow from horseback.

Using small but powerful composite bows, the steppe people gradually became the most powerful military force in the world. From a young age, almost the entire male population was trained in riding and archery, both of which were necessary skills for survival on the steppe. By adulthood, these activities were second nature. These mounted archers were more mobile than any other force at the time, being able to travel forty miles per day with ease.

The steppe peoples quickly came to dominate Central Asia, forcing the scattered city states and kingdoms to pay them tribute or face annihilation. The martial ability of the steppe peoples was limited, however, by the lack of political structure within the tribes. Confederations of various groups would sometimes form under a ruler known as a khan. When large numbers of nomads acted in unison they could be devastating, as when the Huns arrived in Western Europe. However, tradition dictated that any dominion conquered in such wars should be divided among all of the khan's sons, so these empires often declined as quickly as they formed.

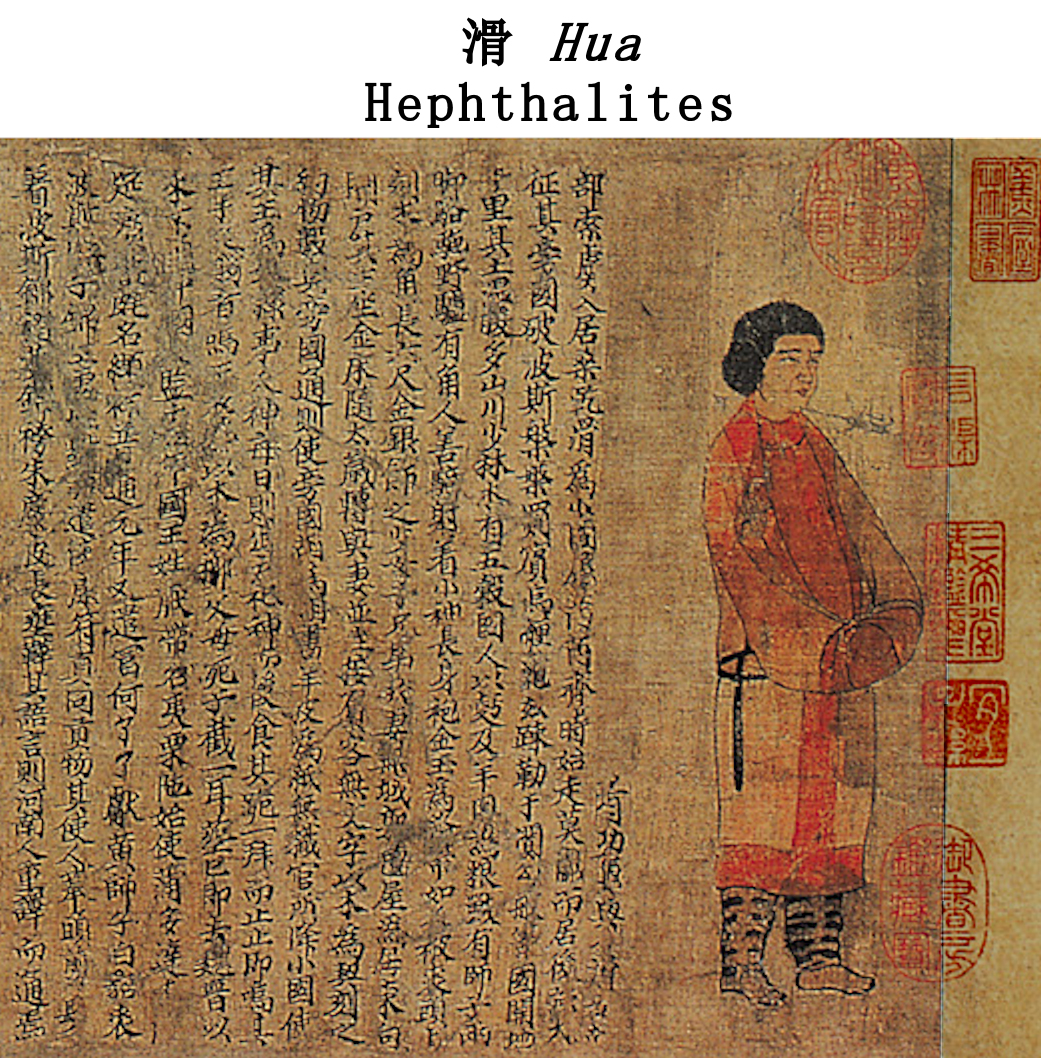
Tang Chinese painting about the Hephthalites, which ruled southern Central Asia, specifically what is today Uzbekistan.

Once the foreign powers were expelled, several indigenous empires formed in Central Asia. The Hephthalites were the most powerful of these nomad groups in the 6th and 7th century and controlled much of the region. In the 10th and 11th centuries, the region was divided between several powerful states including the Samanid dynasty, that of the Seljuk Turks, and the Khwarezmid Empire.

The most spectacular power to rise out of Central Asia developed when Genghis Khan united the tribes of Mongolia. Using superior military techniques, the Mongol Empire spread to comprise all of Central Asia and China as well as large parts of Russia, and the Middle East. After Genghis Khan died in 1227, most of Central Asia continued to be dominated by the Mongol successor Chagatai Khanate. This state proved to be short lived, as in 1369 Timur, a Turco-Mongol ruler, conquered most of the region.

Even harder than keeping a steppe empire together was governing conquered lands outside the region. While the steppe peoples of Central Asia found conquest of these areas easy, they found governing almost impossible. The diffuse political structure of the steppe confederacies was maladapted to the complex states of the settled peoples. Moreover, the armies of the nomads were based upon large numbers of horses, generally three or four for each warrior. Maintaining these forces required large stretches of grazing land, not present outside the steppe. Any extended time away from the homeland would thus cause the steppe armies to gradually disintegrate. To govern settled peoples the steppe peoples were forced to rely on the local bureaucracy, a factor that would lead to the rapid assimilation of the nomads into the culture of those they had conquered. Another important limit was that the armies, for the most part, were unable to penetrate the forested regions to the north; thus, such states as Novgorod and Muscovy began to grow in power.

In the 14th century, much of Central Asia, and many areas beyond it, were conquered by Timur (1336–1405) who is known in the west as Tamerlane. It was during Timur's reign that the nomadic steppe culture of Central Asia fused with the settled culture of Iran. One of its consequences was an entirely new visual language that glorified Timur and subsequent Timurid rulers. This visual language was also used to articulate their commitment to Islam. Timur's large empire collapsed soon after his death, however. The region then became divided among a series of smaller khanates, including the Khanate of Khiva, the Khanate of Bukhara, the Khanate of Kokand, and the Khanate of Kashgar.

== Early modern period (16th to 19th centuries) ==
The lifestyle that had existed largely unchanged since 500 BCE began to disappear after 1500. Important changes to the world economy in the 14th and 15th century reflected the impact of the development of nautical technology. Ocean trade routes were pioneered by the Europeans, who had been cut off from the Silk Road by the Muslim states that controlled its western termini. The long-distance trade linking East Asia and India to Western Europe increasingly began to move over the seas and not through Central Asia. However, the emergence of Russia as a world power enabled Central Asia to continue its role as a conduit for overland trade of other sorts, now linking India with Russia on a north–south axis.

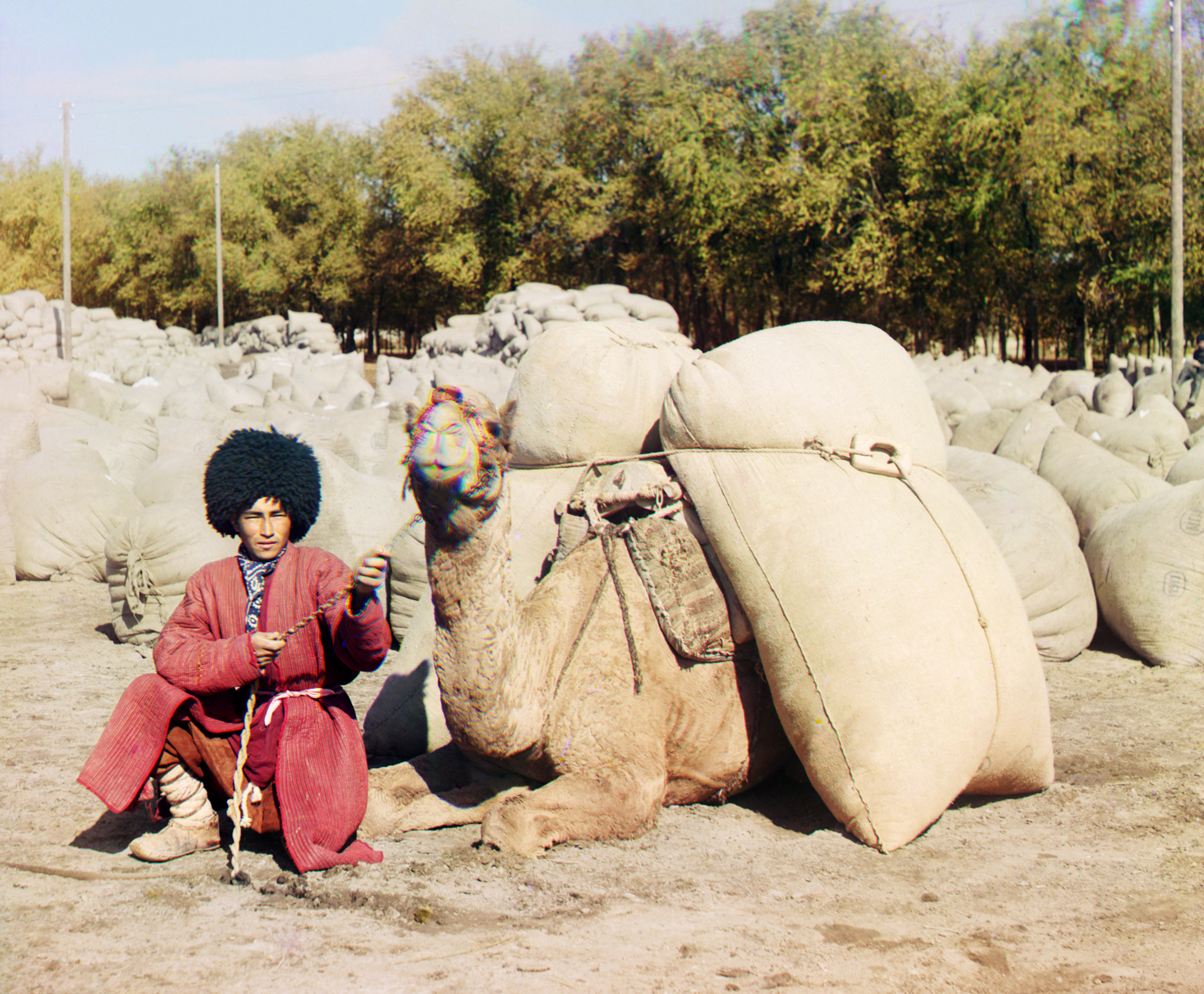
A native Turkmen man in traditional dress with his dromedary camel in Turkmenistan, c. 1915.

An even more important development was the introduction of gunpowder-based weapons. The gunpowder revolution allowed settled peoples to defeat the steppe horsemen in open battle for the first time. Construction of these weapons required the infrastructure and economies of large societies and were thus impractical for nomadic peoples to produce. The domain of the nomads began to shrink as, beginning in the 15th century, the settled powers gradually began to conquer Central Asia.

The last steppe empire to emerge was that of the Dzungars who conquered much of East Turkestan and Mongolia. However, in a sign of the changed times they proved unable to match the Chinese and were decisively defeated by the forces of the Qing dynasty. In the 18th century, the Qing emperors, themselves originally from the far eastern edge of the steppe, campaigned in the west and in Mongolia, with the Qianlong Emperor taking control of Xinjiang in 1758. The Mongol threat was overcome and much of Inner Mongolia was annexed to China.

One Turko-Mongolic dynasty that remained prominent during this period was the Mughal Empire, whose founder Babur traced descent to Timur. While the Mughals were never able to conquer Babur's original domains in Fergana Valley, which fell to the Shaybanids, they maintained influence in the Afghanistan region until the late 17th century even as they dominated India. After the Mughal Empire's decline in the 18th century, the Durrani Empire from Afghanistan would briefly overrun the North Western region of India, by the 19th century, the rise of the British Empire would limit the impact of Afghan conquerors.

The Chinese dominions stretched into the heart of Central Asia and included the Khanate of Kokand, which paid tribute to Beijing. Outer Mongolia and Xinjiang did not become provinces of the Chinese empire, but rather were directly administered by the Qing dynasty. The fact that there was no provincial governor meant that the local rulers retained most of their powers and this special status also prevented emigration from the rest of China into the region. Persia also began to expand north, especially under the rule of Nader Shah, who extended Persian dominion well past the Oxus. After his death, however, the Persian empire rapidly crumbled.

== Russian expansion into Central Asia (19th century) ==
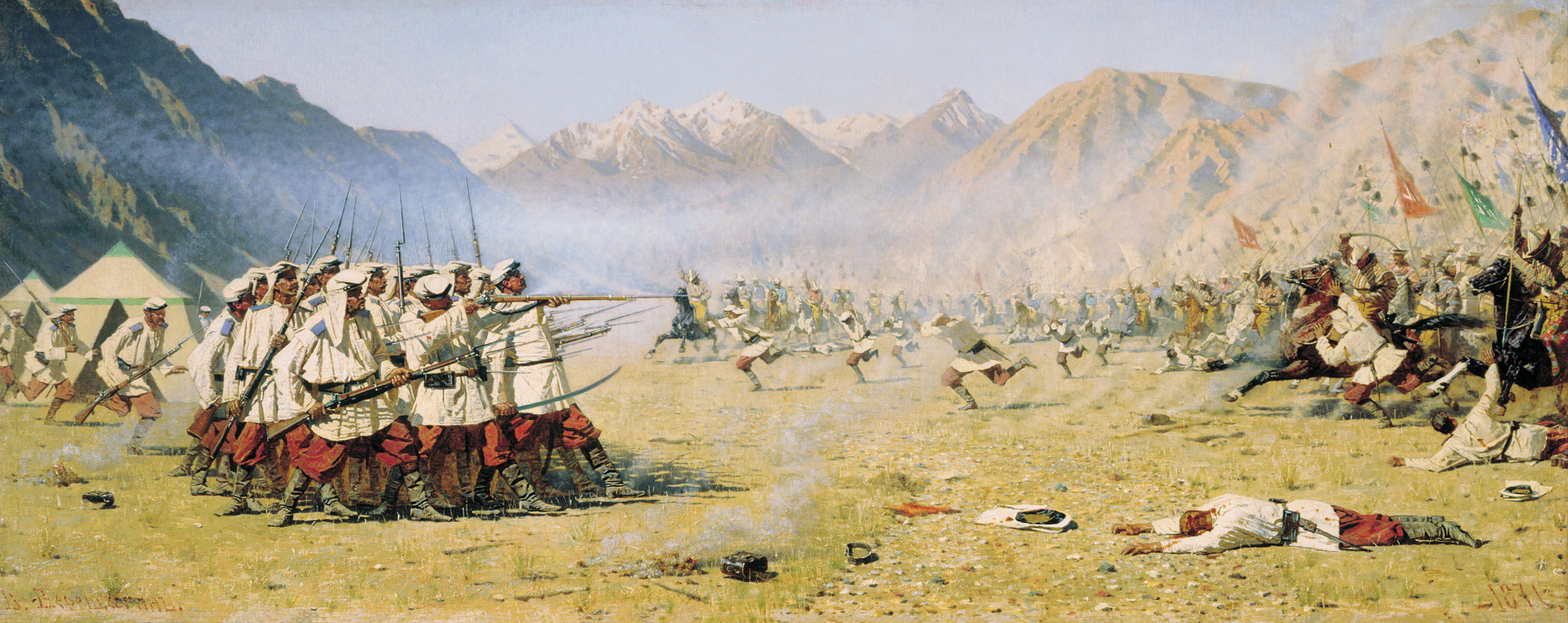
Russian wars of conquest in Turkestan

The Russians also expanded south, first with the transformation of the Ukrainian steppe into an agricultural heartland, and subsequently onto the fringe of the Kazakh steppes, beginning with the foundation of the fortress of Orenburg. The slow Russian conquest of the heart of Central Asia began in the early 19th century, although Peter the Great had sent a failed expedition under Prince Bekovitch-Cherkassky against Khiva as early as the 1720s.

By the 1800s, the locals could do little to resist the Russian advance, although the Kazakhs of the Great Horde under Kenesary Kasimov rose in rebellion from 1837 to 1846. Until the 1870s, for the most part, Russian interference was minimal, leaving native ways of life intact and local government structures in place. With the conquest of Turkestan after 1865 and the consequent securing of the frontier, the Russians gradually expropriated large parts of the steppe and gave these lands to Russian farmers, who began to arrive in large numbers. This process was initially limited to the northern fringes of the steppe and it was only in the 1890s that significant numbers of Russians began to settle farther south, especially in Zhetysu (Semirechye).

== The Great Game ==
=== Russian campaigns ===
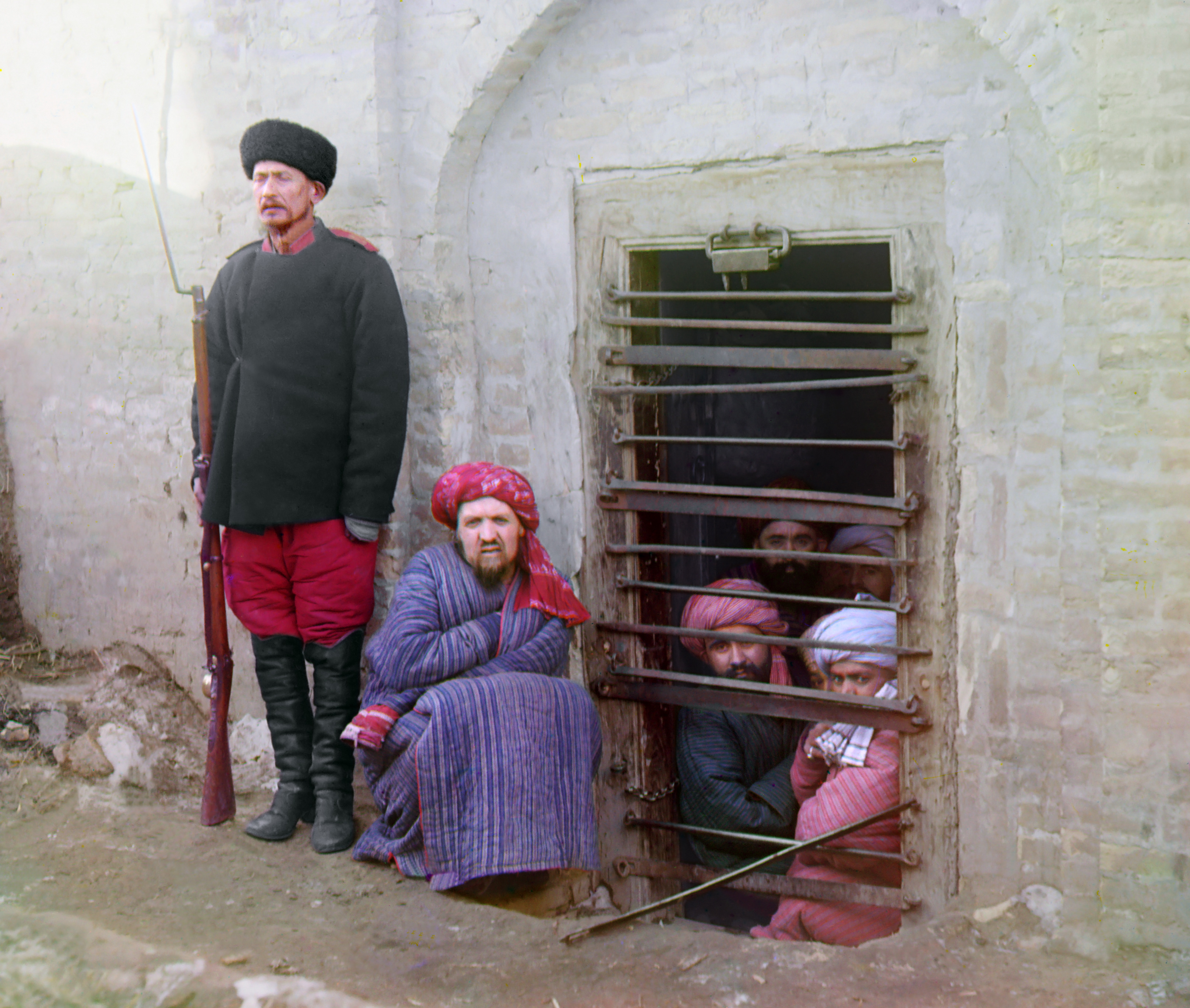
Prisoners in a zindan, a traditional Central Asian prison, in the Bukharan Protectorate under Imperial Russia, ca. 1910

The forces of the khanates were poorly equipped and could do little to resist Russia's advances, although the Kokandian commander Alimqul led a quixotic campaign before being killed outside Chimkent. The main opposition to Russian expansion into Turkestan came from the British, who felt that Russia was growing too powerful and threatening the northwest frontiers of British India. This rivalry came to be known as the Great Game, where both powers competed to advance their own interests in the region. It did little to slow the pace of conquest north of the Oxus, but did ensure that Afghanistan remained independent as a buffer state between the two empires.

After the fall of Tashkent to General Cherniaev in 1865, Khodjend, Djizak, and Samarkand fell to the Russians in quick succession over the next three years as the Khanate of Kokand and the Emirate of Bukhara were repeatedly defeated. In 1867, the governor-generalship of Russian Turkestan was established under General Konstantin Petrovich von Kaufmann, with its headquarters at Tashkent. In 1881–1885, the Transcaspian region was annexed in the course of a campaign led by Generals Mikhail Annenkov and Mikhail Skobelev, and Ashgabat (from Persia), Merv, and Panjdeh (from Afghanistan) all came under Russian control.

Russian expansion was halted in 1887 when Russia and Great Britain delineated the northern border of Afghanistan. Bukhara and the Khanate of Khiva remained quasi-independent, but were essentially protectorates along the lines of the princely states of British India. Although the conquest was prompted by almost purely military concerns, in the 1870s and 1880s Turkestan came to play a reasonably important economic role within the Russian Empire.

Because of the American Civil War, cotton shot up in price in the 1860s, becoming an increasingly important commodity in the region, although its cultivation was on a much lesser scale than during the Soviet period. The cotton trade led to improvements: the Trans-Caspian Railway from Krasnovodsk to Samarkand and Tashkent, and the Trans-Aral Railway from Orenburg to Tashkent were constructed. In the long term the development of a cotton monoculture would render Turkestan dependent on food imports from Western Siberia, and the Turkestan–Siberia Railway was already planned when the First World War broke out.

Russian rule still remained distant from the local populace, mostly concerning itself with the small minority of Russian inhabitants of the region. The local Muslims were not considered full Russian citizens. They did not have the full privileges of Russians, but nor did they have the same obligations, such as military service. The Tsarist regime left substantial elements of the previous regimes (such as Muslim religious courts) intact, and local self-government at the village level was quite extensive.

=== Qing dynasty ===
During the 17th and 18th centuries, the Qing dynasty made several campaigns to conquer the Dzungar Mongols. In the meantime, they incorporated parts of Central Asia into the Chinese Empire. Internal turmoil largely halted Chinese expansion in the 19th century. In 1867 Yakub Beg led a rebellion that saw Kashgar declaring its independence as the Taiping and Nian Rebellions in the heartland of the empire prevented the Chinese from reasserting their control.

Instead, the Russians expanded, annexing the Chu and Ili Valleys and the city of Kuldja from the Chinese Empire. After Yakub Beg's death at Korla in 1877 his state collapsed as the area was reconquered by China. After lengthy negotiations Kuldja was returned to Beijing by Russia in 1884.

=== Revolution and revolt ===
During the First World War the Muslim exemption from conscription was removed by the Russians, sparking the Central Asian Revolt of 1916. When the Russian Revolution of 1917 occurred, a provisional Government of Jadid Reformers, also known as the Turkestan Muslim Council met in Kokand and declared Turkestan's autonomy. This new government was quickly crushed by the forces of the Tashkent Soviet, and the semi-autonomous states of Bukhara and Khiva were also invaded. The main independence forces were rapidly crushed, but guerrillas known as Basmachi continued to fight the communists until 1924. Mongolia was also swept up by the Russian Revolution and, though it never became a Soviet republic, it became a communist People's Republic in 1924.

The creation of the Republic of China in 1911 and the general turmoil in China affected the Qing dynasty's holdings in Central Asia. Republic of China's control of the region was relegated to southern Xinjiang and there was a dual threat from Islamic separatists and communists. Eventually the region became largely independent under the control of the provincial governor. Rather than invade, the Soviet Union established a network of consulates in the region and sent aid and technical advisors.

By the 1930s, the governor of Xinjiang's relationship with Moscow was far more important than that with Nanking. The Chinese Civil War further destabilised the region and saw Turkic nationalists make attempts at independence. In 1933, the First East Turkestan Republic was declared, but it was destroyed soon after with the aid of the Soviet troops.

After the German invasion of the Soviet Union in 1941, Governor Sheng Shicai of Xinjiang gambled and broke his links to Moscow, moving to ally himself with the Kuomintang. This led to a civil war within the region. Sheng was eventually forced to flee and the Soviet-backed Second East Turkestan Republic was formed in northern Dzungaria, while the Republic of China retained control of southern Xinjiang. Both states were annexed by the People's Republic of China in 1949.

== Soviet era (1918–1991) ==
After being conquered by Bolshevik forces, Soviet Central Asia experienced a flurry of administrative reorganisation. In 1918, the Bolsheviks set up the Turkestan Autonomous Soviet Socialist Republic, and Bukhara and Khiva also became SSRs. In 1919, the Conciliatory Commission for Turkestan Affairs was established, to try to improve relations between the locals and the Communists. New policies were introduced, respecting local customs and religion. In 1920, the Kirghiz Autonomous Soviet Socialist Republic, covering modern Kazakhstan, was set up. It was renamed the Kazakh Autonomous Soviet Socialist Republic in 1925. In 1924, the Soviets created the Uzbek SSR and the Turkmen SSR. In 1929, the Tajik SSR was split from the Uzbek SSR. The Kyrgyz Autonomous Oblast became an SSR in 1936.

These borders had little to do with ethnic make-up, but the Soviets felt it important to divide the region. They saw both pan-Turkism and pan-Islamism as threats, which dividing Turkestan would limit. Under the Soviets, the local languages and cultures were systematised and codified, and their differences clearly demarcated and encouraged. New Cyrillic writing systems were introduced, to break links with Turkey and Iran. Under the Soviets the southern border was almost completely closed and all travel and trade was directed north through Russia.

During the period of forced collectivisation under Joseph Stalin at least a million persons died, mostly in the Kazakh SSR. Islam, as well as other religions, were also attacked. In the Second World War several million refugees and hundreds of factories were moved to the relative security of Central Asia; and the region permanently became an important part of the Soviet industrial complex. Several important military facilities were also located in the region, including nuclear testing facilities and the Baikonur Cosmodrome. The Virgin Lands campaign, starting in 1954, was a massive Soviet agricultural resettlement program that brought more than 300,000 individuals, mostly from the Ukraine, to the northern Kazakh SSR and the Altai region of the Russian SFSR. This was a major change in the ethnicity of the region.

Similar processes occurred in Xinjiang and the rest of western China where the People's Republic of China quickly established control from the Second East Turkestan Republic that controlled northern Xinjiang and the Republic of China forces that controlled southern Xinjiang after the Qing dynasty. The area was subject to a number of development schemes and, like Soviet Central Asia, one focus was on the growing of the cotton cash crop. These efforts were overseen by the Xinjiang Production and Construction Corps. The XPCC also encouraged Han Chinese to return to Xinjiang after many had migrated out during the Muslim revolts against the Qing dynasty.

Political turmoil has led to major demographic shifts in the region: During the Qing dynasty there were 60% Turkic and 30% Han Chinese in the region, after the Muslim revolts the percentage of Han Chinese dropped to as low as 7%, and by the year 2000 some 40% of the population of Xinjiang were Han. As with the Soviet Union local languages and cultures were mostly encouraged and Xinjiang was granted autonomous status. However, Islam was much persecuted, especially during the Cultural Revolution. Many people from other parts of China fled to Xinjiang due to the failed agricultural policies of the Great Leap Forward in other provinces. However, the Great Leap Forward did not affect much of Xinjiang due to its geographical isolation from other parts of China.

=== Soviet evacuation and World War II population deportations ===
The Second World War sparked the widespread migration of Soviet citizens to the rear of the USSR. Much of this movement was directed to Soviet Central Asia. These migrations included official, state-organised evacuations and deportations as well as the non-sanctioned, panicked flight from the front by both general citizenry and important officials. The evacuation of Soviet citizens and industry during World War II was an essential element of their overall success in the war, and Central Asia served as a main destination for evacuees.

The German invasion of the Soviet Union began on June 22, 1941. A decree from the Presidium of the executive committee on the same day forbade the entry or exit from the USSR's border regions, which were under a state of martial law. Such mandates demonstrated the Soviets' fear of spreading panic and their commitment to asserting direct state control over wartime relocations to maintain order. Soviet wartime population policy consisted of two distinct operations: deportation and evacuation. Deportation aimed to clear regions near the front of potentially insidious anti-Soviet elements that could hamper the war effort, while evacuation policy aimed to move Soviet industry and intelligentsia to the rear, where they would be safe.

==== Deportations along ethnic lines ====
Soviet officials organised their wartime deportation policy largely along ethnic lines. As a response to the German invasion, Soviet citizens of German descent in border regions were targeted for deportation to the rear where Soviet authorities had no need to worry of their conspiring with the enemy. Such dubious ethnically derived logic was not reserved for Germans. Many Finns were also forcibly relocated in the first year of the war simply for their heritage, though they were mainly sent to remote areas in the northern rear, such as Siberia, rather than Central Asia. A large portion of the German deportees, however, were sent to Kazakhstan. The remobilisation of relocated human resources into the labour force was pivotal to Soviet wartime production policy, and to that end many able-bodied deportees were conscripted into a "labour army" with military style discipline.

By early 1942, as many as 20,800 ethnic Germans had been organised into battalions in this labour army, though this number would grow to as much as 222,000 by early 1944 as conscription criteria were broadened. The NKVD employed about 101,000 members of the labour army at construction sites to develop infrastructure for the war effort. Those who were not assigned to the labour army were used for timber harvesting, the construction of railways and other infrastructure, or sent to collective farms.

As the tide turned in the war, and the Soviets began to reclaim the territories they lost to the initial German advance, they began a new wave of deportations of unfavoured ethnic groups. Karachais, Kalmyks, Chechens, Ingushetians, Kabardians, and Crimean Tatars were all deported to Central Asia for their supposed fraternisation with occupying German forces. These groups were sent mostly to Kazakhstan, Kyrgyzstan, and Uzbekistan for their infidelity. These punitive deportations were also conducted to keep "anti-Soviet elements" far from the border – where the Soviet offensive against Germany was progressing – for fear of spying or sabotage.

==== Evacuation of Soviet citizens to Central Asia ====
Many Soviet citizens ended up in Central Asia during World War II, not as a result of deportation, but evacuation. The evacuation focused on the movement of critical wartime industry and the factory workers responsible for overseeing such production. Whole factories and their employees were moved together via railway eastward to cities like Tashkent, which received a lion's share of the evacuees.

The initial attempts at evacuation while the war was still in its early stages through early 1942 were a far cry from the organised affair that the Soviet central bureaucracy envisaged. Throughout the summer and fall of 1941, numerous Soviet frontier cities evacuated in a haphazard and panicked fashion before the German onslaught. A number of factors led to this lack of organisation. For one, the Soviet evacuation plans were thrown together fairly hurriedly, and a lot of the logistical planning was done on the fly as the German advance was already sweeping through the Soviet border zone. The German invasion also hampered the effectiveness of the Soviet response by shattering their communications in the war's early stages; many Soviet leaders were unable to gather reliable information about the positions of German forces until it was too late to effect an orderly evacuation.

There was also a desire on the part of Soviet officials to forestall any evacuations until it was absolutely necessary, the marching orders were often to continue factory production until the eve of occupation before hurriedly dismantling and transporting factory equipment, and destroying what couldn't be moved in time. As a result of the delay in evacuations, they were often carried out under German aerial bombardment, which led to additional confusion among the frightened citizenry. Historian Rebecca Manley describes these early evacuations as being charactered by "three phenomena: the 'flight' of officials, the flight of the population, and 'panic'".

The early flight of Soviet officials who were supposed to manage the evacuation was roundly condemned by Soviet leaders, but often their retreat resulted from a realisation that evacuation procedures had started too late, and that there was no way to effectively execute it. Additionally, Soviet officials who remained in a city captured by German forces feared execution by Nazis on the hunt for communists. Avoiding that, the officials knew that they would be subject to intense interrogation as to what happened by suspicious Soviets upon returning to the fold.

Despite these setbacks in the implementation of evacuation policy early in the war, around 12 million Soviet citizens successfully evacuated in 1941, even if a number of these were the result of disorganised, "spontaneous self-evacuation," and another 4.5 million evacuated the following year. In addition, the factories that were successfully evacuated to the Central Asian rear would help provide the productive capacity the Soviets needed to eventually win the war, as well as preventing the Germans from acquiring additional industrial resources. By providing a safe haven from the German advance for Soviet citizens, Central Asia played a critical role in securing Allied victory. The evacuation itself was only part of the difficulty, however, as evacuees arriving in Central Asia faced many trials and tribulations.

Due to the haphazard nature of evacuation, many labourers did not arrive with their factory, and had to find labour on their own, though jobs were hard to come by. Additionally, cities like Tashkent became overwhelmed at the sheer volume of people arriving at its gates and had great difficulty supplying the food and shelter necessary for evacuees. Upon arrival, many evacuees died of illness or starvation in extreme poverty in Central Asia. Uzbek officials set up aid stations at Tashkent, which were mirrored at other railway stations to help combat the poverty, but they could only do so much as little could be spared economically for the war effort. Despite these troubles, the ability of Central Asia to absorb Soviet industry and population to the extent that it did and in the harried manner that it did was impressive. The Germans certainly didn't foresee the preparedness of Soviet Central Asia, and in the end they paid dearly for it.

== Since 1991 ==
From 1988 to 1992, a free press and multi-party system developed in the Central Asian republics as perestroika pressured the local communist parties to open up. What Svat Soucek calls the "Central Asian Spring" was very short-lived as soon after independence, former communist party officials recast themselves as local strongmen. Political stability in the region has mostly been maintained, with the major exception of the Tajikistani Civil War that lasted from 1992 to 1997. 2005 also saw the largely peaceful ousting of Kyrgyz president Askar Akayev in the Tulip Revolution and an outbreak of violence in Andijan, Uzbekistan.

Much of the population of Soviet Central Asia was indifferent to the collapse of the Soviet Union, even the large Russian populations in Kazakhstan (roughly 40% of the total) and Tashkent, Uzbekistan. Aid from the Kremlin had also been central to the economies of Central Asia, each of the republics receiving massive transfers of funds from Moscow.

Independence largely resulted from the efforts of the small groups of nationalistic, mostly local intellectuals, and from little interest in Moscow for retaining the expensive region. While never a part of the Soviet Union, Mongolia followed a somewhat similar path. Often acting as the unofficial sixteenth Soviet republic, it shed the communist system only in 1996, but quickly ran into economic problems.

The economic performance of the region since independence has been mixed. It contains some of the largest reserves of natural resources in the world, but there are important difficulties in transporting them. Since it lies farther from the ocean than anywhere else in the world, and its southern borders lay closed for decades, the main trade routes and pipelines run through Russia. As a result, Russia still exerts more influence over the region than in any other former Soviet republics. Nevertheless, the rising energy importance of the Caspian Sea entails a great involvement in the region by the US. The former Soviet republics of the Caucasus now have their own US special envoy and inter-agency working groups. Former US Secretary of Energy Bill Richardson had claimed that "the Caspian region will hopefully save us [the US] from total dependence on Middle East oil".

Some analysts, such as Myers Jaffe and Robert A. Manning, estimate however that US' entry into the region (with initiatives such as the US-favored Baku-Tbilisi-Ceyhan pipeline) as a major actor may complicate Moscow's chances of making a decisive break with its past economic mistakes and geopolitical excesses in Central Asia. They also regard as a myth the assertion that Caspian oil and gas will be a cheaper and more secure alternative to supplies from the Persian Gulf.

Despite these reservations and fears, since the late 1980s, Azerbaijan, Kazakhstan, and Turkmenistan have gradually moved to centre stage in the global energy markets and are now regarded as key factors of the international energy security. Azerbaijan and Kazakhstan in particular have succeeded in attracting massive foreign investment to their oil and gas sectors. According to Gawdat Bahgat, the investment flow suggests that the geological potential of the Caspian region as a major source of oil and gas is not in doubt.

Russia and Kazakhstan started a closer energy co-operation in 1998, which was further consolidated in May 2002, when Presidents Vladimir Putin and Nursultan Nazarbayev signed a protocol dividing three gas fields – Kurmangazy, Tsentralnoye, and Khvalynskoye – on an equal basis. Following the ratification of bilateral treaties, Russia, Kazakhstan, and Azerbaijan declared that the northern Caspian was open for business and investment as they had reached a consensus on the legal status of the basin. Iran and Turkmenistan refused however to recognise the validity of these bilateral agreements; Iran is rejecting any bilateral agreement to divide the Caspian. On the other hand, US' choices in the region (within the framework of the so-called "pipeline diplomacy"), such as the strong support of the Baku pipeline (the project was eventually approved and was completed in 2005), reflect a political desire to avoid both Russia and Iran.

Increasingly, other powers have begun to involve themselves in Central Asia. Soon after the Central Asian states won their independence, Turkey began to look east, and a number of organizations are attempting to build links between the western and eastern Turks. Iran, which for millennia had close links with the region, has also been working to build ties and the Central Asian states now have good relations with the Islamic Republic. One important player in the new Central Asia has been Saudi Arabia, which has been funding the Islamic revival in the region. Olcott notes that soon after independence Saudi money paid for massive shipments of Qurans to the region and for the construction and repair of a large number of mosques. In Tajikistan alone, an estimated 500 mosques per year have been erected with Saudi money.

The formerly atheistic communist party leaders have mostly converted to Islam. Small Islamist groups have formed in several of the countries, but radical Islam has little history in the region; the Central Asian societies have remained largely secular and all five states enjoy good relations with Israel. Central Asia is still home to a large Jewish population, the largest group being the Bukharan Jews, and important trade and business links have developed between those that left for Israel after independence and those remaining.

China sees the region as an essential future source of raw materials; most Central Asian countries are members of the Shanghai Cooperation Organisation. This has affected Xinjiang and other parts of western China that have seen infrastructure programs building new links and also new military facilities. Chinese Central Asia has been far from the centre of that country's economic boom and the area has remained considerably poorer than the coast. China also sees a threat in the potential of the new states to support separatist movements among its own Turkic minorities.

One important Soviet legacy that has only gradually been appreciated is the vast ecological destruction. Most notable is the gradual drying of the Aral Sea. During the Soviet era, it was decided that the traditional crops of melons and vegetables would be replaced by water-intensive growing of cotton for Soviet textile mills. Massive irrigation efforts were launched that diverted a considerable percentage of the annual inflow to the sea, causing it to shrink steadily. Furthermore, vast tracts of Kazakhstan were used for nuclear testing, and there exists a plethora of decrepit factories and mines.

In the first part of 2008, Central Asia experienced a severe energy crisis, a shortage of both electricity and fuel, aggravated by abnormally cold temperatures, failing infrastructure, and a shortage of food in which aid from the west began to assist the region.

As of 2019, despite its common cultural and historical past Central Asia has been "one of the least integrated regions in the world".

== See also ==
- Eurasian nomads
- Eurasian Steppe
- History of Afghanistan
- History of Kazakhstan
- History of Kyrgyzstan
- History of Mongolia
- History of Tajikistan
- History of the central steppe
- History of Turkmenistan
- History of Uzbekistan
- History of Xinjiang

== Notes ==
=== References ===
- Altschuler, Mordechai (1993), "Escape and Evacuation of Soviet Jews at the Time of the Nazi Invasion", in Lucjan Dobroszycki; Jeffrey S. Gurock (eds.), The Holocaust in the Soviet Union, New York, NY: M. E. Sharpe
- Bahgat, Gawdat (March 2006), "Central Asia and Energy Security", Asian Affairs, 37 (1), Routledge – Taylor and Francis Group: 1–16, doi:10.1080/03068370500456819, S2CID 162353264
- Beckwith, Christopher I. (1987), The Tibetan Empire in Central Asia, Princeton: Princeton University Press, ISBN 978-0-691-02469-1
- Benn, Charles (2002), China's Golden Age: Everyday Life in the Tang dynasty, Oxford University Press, ISBN 978-0-19-517665-0
- Chang, Chun-shu (2007), The Rise of the Chinese Empire: Volume II; Frontier, Immigration, & Empire in Han China, 130 B.C. – A.D. 157, Ann Arbor, MI: University of Michigan Press, ISBN 978-0-472-11534-1
- Cui, Mingde (2005), The History of Chinese Heqin, Beijing: Renmin Chubanshe, ISBN 978-7-01-004828-4
- Di Cosmo, Nicola (2002), Ancient China and Its Enemies: the Rise of Nomadic Power in East Asian History, Cambridge: Cambridge University Press, ISBN 978-0-521-77064-4
- Ebrey, Patricia Buckley; Walthall, Anne; Palais, James B. (2006), East Asia: A Cultural, Social, and Political History, Boston: Houghton Mifflin, ISBN 978-0-618-13384-0
- Ebrey, Patricia Buckley (1999), The Cambridge Illustrated History of China, Cambridge: Cambridge University Press, ISBN 978-0-521-66991-7
- Herodotus, Histories, IV. See original text in perseus project.
- Gernet, Jacques (1996), A History of Chinese Civilization (2nd ed.), New York: Cambridge University Press, ISBN 978-0-521-49781-7
- Ilyasov, Jangar (2001). "The Hephthalite Terracotta". Silk Road Art and Archaeology. 7. Kamakura: 187–200.
- Kurbanov, Aydogdy (2010). The Hephthalites: Archaeological and Historical Analysis (PDF) (PhD). Berlin: Berlin Freie Universität. Archived from the original (PDF) on 24 April 2025 – via Freie Universitat Berlin Repository.
- Litvinsky, B. A.; Guang-da, Zhang; Samghabadi, R. Shabani, eds. (1996). History of Civilizations of Central Asia. Volume III: The crossroads of civilizations: A.D. 250 to 750. Paris: UNESCO. ISBN 978-92-3-103211-0.
  - Dani, A. H.; Litvinsky, B. A.; Zamir Safi, M. H. "Eastern Kushans, Kidarites in Gandhara and Kashmir, and Later Hephthalites". In Litvinsky, Guang-da & Samghabadi (1996), pp. 163–184.
- Loewe, Michael (1986), "The Former Han Dynasty", in Denis Twitchett; Michael Loewe (eds.), The Cambridge History of China: Volume I: the Ch'in and Han Empires, 221 B.C. – A.D. 220, Cambridge: Cambridge University Press, pp. 103–222, ISBN 978-0-521-24327-8
- Liu, Zhaoxiang (2000), History of Military Legal System, et al., Beijing: Encyclopedia of China Publishing House, ISBN 978-7-5000-6303-2
- Manley, Rebecca (2009), To the Tashkent Station, Ithaca, NY: Cornell University Press
- Manning, R.; Jaffe, A. (1998), "The myth of the Caspian "Great Game": the real geopolitics of energy", Survival: Global Politics and Strategy, 40 (4), International Institute for Strategic Studies: 112–129, doi:10.1080/713660015
- Polian, Pavel (2004), "Forced migrations during and after the Second World War (1939–1953)", Against Their Will: the History and Geography of Forced Migrations in the USSR, Budapest: Central European University Press
- Richardson, H. E. (1985), A Corpus of Early Tibetan Inscriptions, Royal Asiatic Society, Hertford: Stephen Austin and Sons
- Sen, Tansen (2003), Buddhism, Diplomacy, and Trade: The Realignment of Sino-Indian Relations, 600–1400, Manoa: Asian Interactions and Comparisons, a joint publication of the University of Hawaii Press and the Association for Asian Studies, ISBN 978-0-8248-2593-5
- Soucek, Svat (2000), A History of Inner Asia, Cambridge: Cambridge University Press, ISBN 978-0-521-65169-1
- Stein, R. A. (1972) [1962], Tibetan Civilization (1st English ed.), Stanford: Stanford University Press, ISBN 978-0-8047-0806-7
- Twitchett, Denis (2000), "Tibet in Tang's Grand Strategy", in van de Ven, Hans (ed.), Warfare in Chinese History, Leiden: Koninklijke Brill, pp. 106–179, ISBN 978-90-04-11774-7
- Whitfield, Susan (2004), The Silk Road: Trade, Travel, War and Faith, Chicago: Serindia, ISBN 978-1-932476-12-5
- Xue, Zongzheng (薛宗正) (1992), Turkic peoples (突厥史), Beijing: 中国社会科学出版社, ISBN 978-7-5004-0432-3
- Yü, Ying-shih (1986), "Han Foreign Relations", in Denis Twitchett; Michael Loewe (eds.), The Cambridge History of China: Volume I: the Ch'in and Han Empires, 221 B.C. – A.D. 220, Cambridge: Cambridge University Press, pp. 377–462, ISBN 978-0-521-24327-8
