= Yuri Korchagin field =

Offshore oil field in the Caspian Sea

- Location within Caspian Sea
- Country: Russia
- Location: North Caspian Sea
- Offshore/onshore: Offshore
- Coordinates: 44°16′22″N 48°57′18″E
- Operator: Lukoil–Nizhnevolzhskneft
- Partners: Lukoil

Field history
- Discovery: 2000
- Start of development: 2004
- Start of production: 2010

Production
- Estimated oil in place: 570 million barrels (~7.8×10^{7} t)

The Yuri Korchagin field is an offshore oil field in the Russian sector of the North Caspian Sea. The field is located 180 kilometres (110 mi) from Astrakhan and 240 kilometres (150 mi) from Makhachkala at a sea depth of 11–13 metres (36–43 ft). The field is owned and operated by Lukoil–Nizhnevolzhskneft, a subsidiary of Lukoil. The contractor for drilling operations is a Moscow-based company BKE Shelf (Eurasia Drilling Company). The field is named after the former secretary of the company's board of directors.

== Overview ==
Lukoil started geological survey of North Caspian Sea in 1995. Exploratory drilling started in 1999 by using Astra semi-submersible jack-up rig. The field was discovered in 2000. Its development started in 2004. The first oil was extracted on 28 April 2010. The gross reserves are estimated to be 570 million barrels (91×10^{6} m^{3}) of oil equivalent. The expected peak production rate is 2.5 million tonnes of crude oil and 1.2 billion cubic meters of natural gas per year.

== Development ==
The development will have 30 wells, including 26 production wells, one gas-injection well and three water-injection wells. As of April 2010, one oil production well and one gas extraction well were operational. By mid 2010, a water injection well was added. The wells have been drilled horizontally and their radial placement enables in their simultaneous drilling. Control of drilling operations on the platform and field have been done since 2009 by Eurasia Drilling Company. A total of R34.4bn ($1.12bn) has been spent on field development between 2004 and 2009.

The main production facility is a fixed offshore ice-resistant platform IRP-1. It is 95.5 by 72.2 metres (313 by 237 ft) with weight of 25,655 tonne erupting 86.6 metres (284 ft) above sea level. The platform was built at the Astrakhansky Korabel shipyard in Astrakhan. The technological complex for LSP-1 was constructed by Stroytransgaz. The platform was towed to the field assembled in 2009. The IRP-2 platform is used for accommodation of the personnel. It is 41.5 by 40.2 metres (136 by 132 ft) with weight of 1,340 tonnes. It is 38 by 40.2 metres (125 by 132 ft) above sea level. The platform was constructed at Lukoil-Kaliningradmorneft factory and assembled at the Astrakhansky Korabel shipyard. Marine warranty services for the transportation and installation of platforms were provided by Crane Marine Contractor Limited and Noble Denton. Offshore installation works were done by J. Ray McDermott. IRP-1 and IRP-2 are connected by a 74.2-metre (243 ft) bridge. The offshore complex is supplied by power produced by using extracted gas.

Produced oil is transported to the floating storage unit 58 kilometres (36 mi) away via a 300-millimetre (12 in) subsea pipeline. The floating storage unit, built by Keppel Corporation at the shipyard in Baku, is moored to a single-buoy mooring. Oil transported by shuttle tankers to Makhachkala where it fed to the Transneft's pipeline system.

== See also ==
- Petroleum industry in Russia
