= Khvalynskoye gas field =

Gas condensate field in the Caspian Sea, Kazakhstan

- Country: Kazakhstan
- Location: North Caspian Sea
- Offshore/onshore: offshore
- Operator: Lukoil
- Partners: Lukoil, KazMunayGas, Total S.A., GDF Suez

Field history
- Discovery: 2002
- Start of production: 2016

Production
- Estimated oil in place: 36 million tonnes (~ 42×10^{6} m^{3} or 260 million bbl)
- Estimated gas in place: 322×10^{9} m^{3} (11.4×10^{12} cu ft)
- Recoverable gas: 127×10^{9} m^{3} (4.5×10^{12} cu ft)

The Khvalynskoye gas field is a conventional gas condensate field located in the Kazakhstan's sector in the northern part of the Caspian Sea. It lies about 260 kilometres (160 mi) from Astrakhan at a sea depth of 25 to 30 metres (82 to 98 ft). The operator of the project is Lukoil with 50% stake. Other partners are KazMunayGas (25%), Total S.A. (17%), and GDF Suez (8%).

== History ==
Lukoil started to drill the Khvalynskaya-1 exploratory well in July 1999 by using Astra semi-submersible jack-up rig. The 4,200-metre (13,800 ft) well was completed in 2000. The Khvalynskaya-3 well was completed in 2002.

In 2003, Lukoil and KazMunayGas signed a deal on the joint development of the Khvalynskoye field. The Khvalynskoye joint venture was established in 2005. In October 2009, Kazakhstan invited Total and GDF Suez to join the project.

== Reserves ==
The field is expected to have 322 billion cubic meters of natural gas, 17 million tons of gas condensate and 36 million tons of oil in place. Recoverable reserves are 127 billion cubic meters of natural gas and 9.6 million tons of gas condensate. The field is expected to become operational in 2016 and to produce 9 billion cubic meters of natural gas per year. The produced oil and gas will be transported to Russia through the Lukoil-operated Yuri Korchagin field.
