= 639 =

Calendar year

639 in various calendars
- Gregorian calendar: 639; DCXXXIX
- Ab urbe condita: 1392
- Armenian calendar: 88; ԹՎ ՁԸ
- Assyrian calendar: 5389
- Balinese saka calendar: 560–561
- Bengali calendar: 45–46
- Berber calendar: 1589
- Buddhist calendar: 1183
- Burmese calendar: 1
- Byzantine calendar: 6147–6148
- Chinese calendar: 戊戌年 (Earth Dog); 3336 or 3129 — to — 己亥年 (Earth Pig); 3337 or 3130
- Coptic calendar: 355–356
- Discordian calendar: 1805
- Ethiopian calendar: 631–632
- Hebrew calendar: 4399–4400
- Hindu calendars
- Vikram Samvat: 695–696
- Shaka Samvat: 560–561
- Kali Yuga: 3739–3740
- Holocene calendar: 10639
- Iranian calendar: 17–18
- Islamic calendar: 17–19
- Japanese calendar: N/A
- Javanese calendar: 529–530
- Julian calendar: 639; DCXXXIX
- Korean calendar: 2972
- Minguo calendar: 1273 before ROC 民前1273年
- Nanakshahi calendar: −829
- Seleucid era: 950/951 AG
- Thai solar calendar: 1181–1182
- Tibetan calendar: ས་ཕོ་ཁྱི་ལོ་ (male Earth-Dog); 765 or 384 or −388 — to — ས་མོ་ཕག་ལོ་ (female Earth-Boar); 766 or 385 or −387

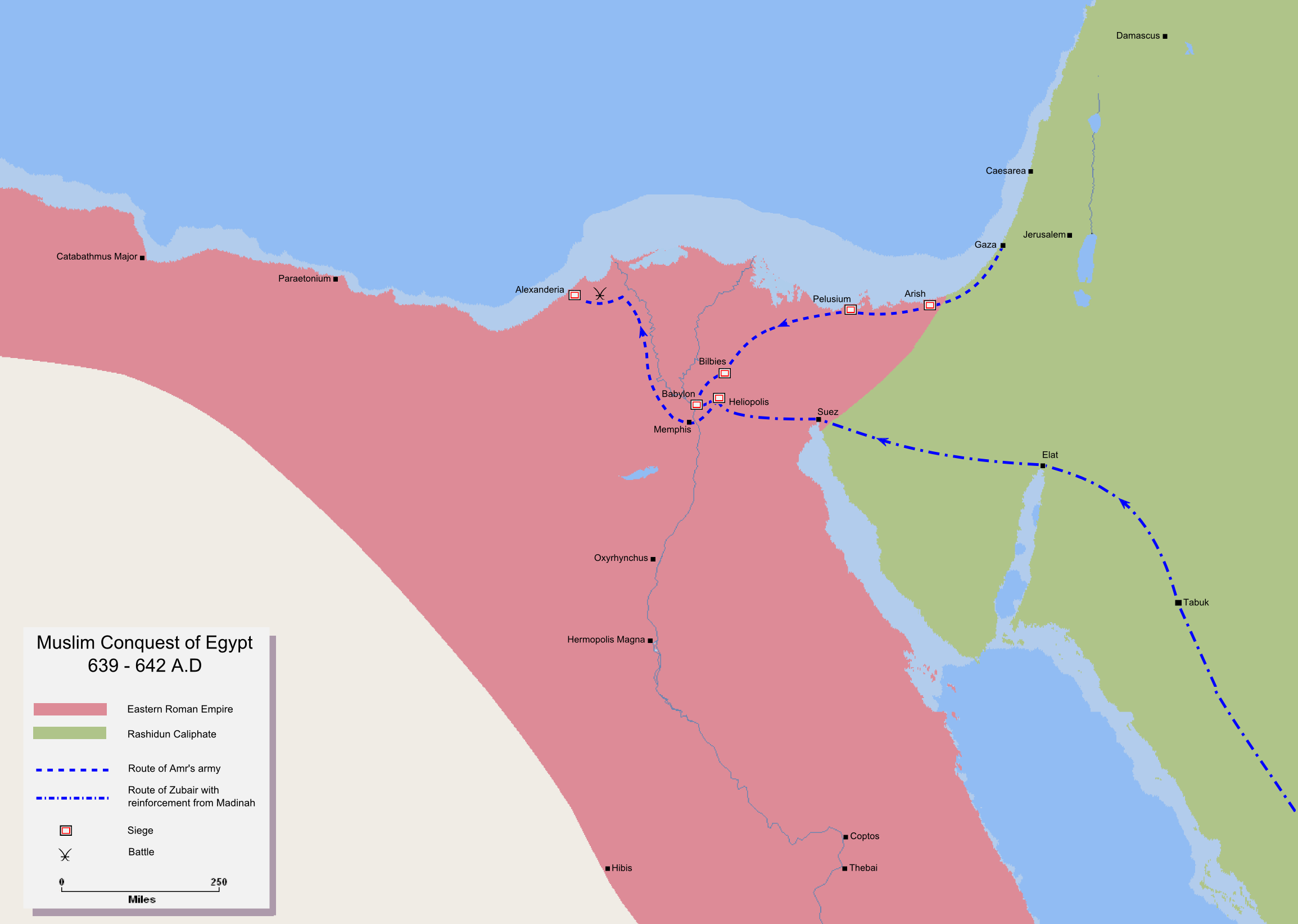
The Muslim invasion of Egypt (639–642)

Year 639 (DCXXXIX) was a common year starting on Friday of the Julian calendar. The denomination 639 for this year has been used since the early medieval period, when the Anno Domini calendar era became the prevalent method in Europe for naming years.

== Events ==
=== By place ===
==== Europe ====
- January 19 – Dagobert I dies after a 10-year reign as king of all the Franks, in which his realm has prospered. He is succeeded by Sigebert III (age 9), independent ruler of Austrasia, and his half-brother Clovis II (age 2), who becomes king of Neustria and Burgundy. Under the supervision of Pepin of Landen, Mayor of the Palace, the royal treasury is distributed between the two brothers and widowed queen Nanthild (regent on Clovis' behalf).

==== Arabian Empire ====
- Arab–Byzantine War: The Rashidun army (4,000 men), under the command of 'Amr ibn al-'As, invades Byzantine Egypt. They capture the strategic town of Pelusium (Nile Delta) after a two-month siege. Arab reinforcements led by Zubayr ibn al-Awwam are sent from Medina to assist Amr's army. The losses incurred by the Muslims are ameliorated by Sinai Bedouins, tribes of Rashida and Lakhm; they join the invaders in conquering Egypt.
- Hormuzan, Persian satrap of Susiana (vassal of the Rashidun Caliphate), revolts against the Muslims and raids Mesopotamia. Arab forces under Abu Musa al-Asha'ari destroy Susa in the lower Zagros Mountains.
- Plague of Emmaus: An epidemic disease which has broken out in Emmaus (Imwas) in Palestine strikes the city and the military camps of the Muslim Arabs, killing most of its population (estimated at 25,000 people) until it subsides in October.

==== Asia ====
- The Xueyantuo assaults the Chinese-conquered vassal of Eastern Tujue. Although simultaneously fighting in Korea against Goguryeo, Emperor Tai Zong commissions his famous general Li Shiji to fend off attacks in the campaign against Xueyantuo.
- An unsuccessful revolt of Prince Kürşat (of the Eastern Turks) breaks out in China.

=== By topic ===
==== Religion ====
- Eligius succeeds Acarius as bishop of Doornik and Noyon. He becomes constituted guardian of the towns of Vermandois, which also include Ghent and Kortrijk (Flanders).
- The First Cathedral of Santa Maria Assunta is founded by the exarch Isaac of Ravenna on Torcello, confirming the island's importance as a centre of population in Venice at this date.

== Births ==
- Aldegonde, Frankish abbess (approximate date)
- Aldhelm, bishop of Sherborne (approximate date)
- Ecgberht of Ripon, bishop of Lindisfarne (d. 729)
- Yŏn Namsan, military leader of Goguryeo (d. 701)

== Deaths ==
- January 19 – Dagobert I, king of the Franks (b. c. 603)
- February 3 – K'inich Yo'nal Ahk I, ajaw of Piedras Negras
- November 27 – Acarius, bishop of Doornik and Noyon
- Suhayl ibn Amr (b. c. 556)
- Abu Jandal ibn Suhayl (b. 594 - 601)
- Abu Ubaidah ibn al-Jarrah, commander of the Rashidun Caliphate (b. 583)
- Muadh ibn Jabal, early Muslim scholar
- Shurahbil ibn Hasana, Rashidun Caliphate general
- Yazid ibn Abi Sufyan, general of the Rashidun Caliphate
- Faílbe Flann mac Áedo Duib, king of Munster (Ireland)
- Wang Gui, chancellor of the Tang dynasty (b. 571)
- Yang Gongren, chancellor of the Tang dynasty
