= Göktürks =

Turkic people in Inner Asia

𐱅𐰇𐰼𐰜:𐰉𐰆𐰑𐰣 Türük Bodun
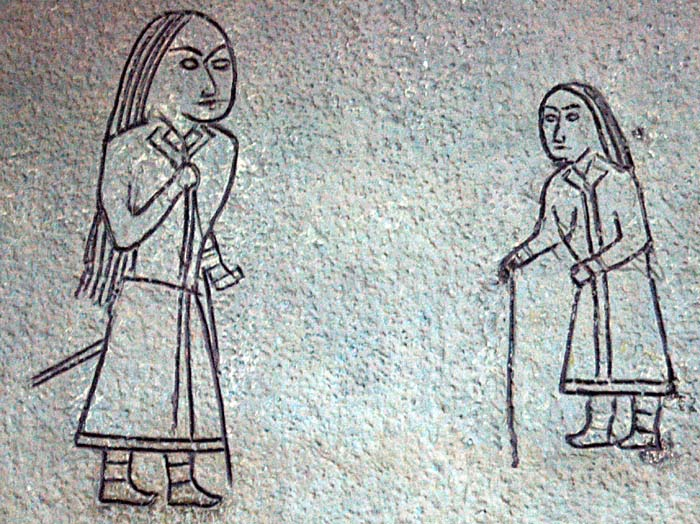
- Gökturk petroglyphs from Orkhon Valley, Mongolia (6th to 8th century)

Regions with significant populations
- Central and Eastern Asia

Languages
- Orkhon Turkic

Religion
- Tengrism, Buddhism

Related ethnic groups
- Türgesh, Toquz Oghuz, Yenisei Kyrgyz, Xueyantuo, Shatuo

The Göktürks (Old Turkic: 𐱅𐰇𐰼𐰜:𐰉𐰆𐰑𐰣, romanized: Türük Bodun; Chinese: 突厥; pinyin: Tūjué; Wade–Giles: T'u-chüeh), also known as Türks, Celestial Turks or Blue Turks, were a Turkic people in medieval Inner Asia. The Göktürks, under the leadership of Bumin Qaghan (d. 552) and his sons, succeeded the Rouran Khaganate as the main power in the region and established the First Turkic Khaganate, one of several nomadic dynasties that would shape the future geolocation, culture, and dominant beliefs of Turkic peoples.

== Etymology ==
=== Origin ===
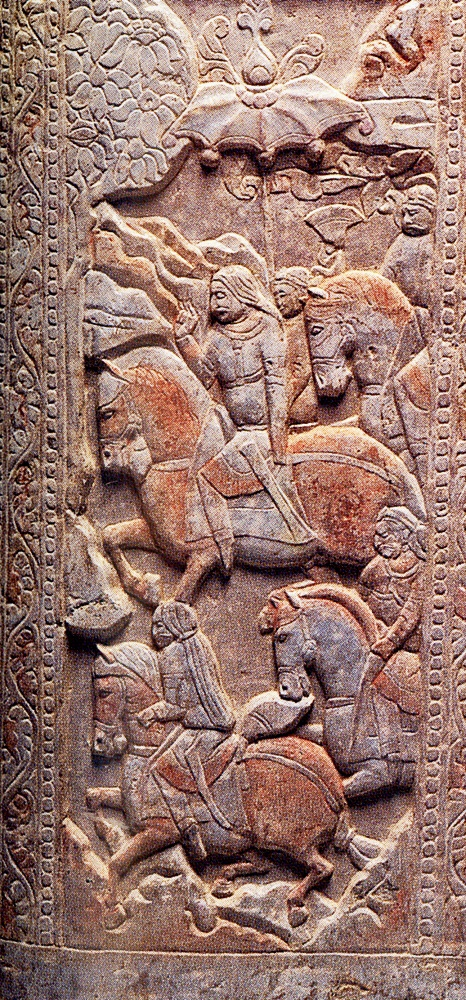
A funerary depiction of long haired Türks in the Kazakh steppe. Miho funerary couch, circa 570.

As an ethnonym, the etymology of Turk is unknown. It is generally believed that the name Türk may have come from the Old Turkic migration-term 𐱅𐰇𐰼𐰜, Türük/Törük, which means 'created, born'.

As a word in Turkic languages, Turk may mean "strong, strength, ripe" or "flourishing, in full strength". It may also mean ripe as for a fruit or "in the prime of life, young, and vigorous" for a person.

The name Gök-türk emerged from the modern Turkish reading of the word Kök as Gök with assumption of equivalence to "sky" in modern Turkish (Gök). The actual meaning of Kök in Kök-türk is debated due to single attestation, with differing opinions as "big, great" or "blue" as a reference to Ashina, the endonym of the ruling clan of the historical ethnic group which was attested in Old Turkic as 𐱅𐰇𐰼𐰜, Türük 𐰚𐰇𐰜:𐱅𐰇𐰼𐰜, Kök Türük, or 𐱅𐰇𐰼𐰚, Türk.

They were known in Middle Chinese historical sources as the Tūjué (Chinese: 突 厥; reconstructed in Middle Chinese as *dwət-kuɑt > tɦut-kyat). The ethnonym was also recorded in various other East Asian languages, Rouran To̤ro̤x/Türǖg, Manchu Tule/Turuhe, Korean 돌궐/Dolgwol, and Old Tibetan Drugu.

In Indo-Iranian languages Turks were recorded under various forms. In Sogdian *Türkit ~ Türküt, tr'wkt, trwkt, turkt > trwkc, trukč; Khotanese Saka Ttūrka/Ttrūka, Middle Persian 𐭲𐭥𐭫𐭪𐭠𐭭 Türkān~Türk.

=== Definition ===
According to Chinese sources, Tūjué meant "combat helmet" (Chinese: 兜 鍪; pinyin: Dōumóu; Wade–Giles: Tou^{¹}-mou^{²}), reportedly because the shape of the Altai Mountains, where they lived, was similar to a combat helmet. Róna-Tas (1991) pointed to a Khotanese-Saka word, tturakä 'lid', semantically stretchable to 'helmet', as a possible source for this folk etymology, yet Golden thinks this connection requires more data.

Göktürk is sometimes interpreted as either "Celestial Turk" or "Blue Turk" (i.e., because sky blue is associated with celestial realms). This is consistent with "the cult of heavenly ordained rule" which was a recurrent element of Altaic political culture and as such may have been imbibed by the Göktürks from their predecessors in Mongolia. "Blue" is traditionally associated with the East as it used in the cardinal system of central Asia, thus meaning "Turks of the East". The name of the ruling Ashina clan may derive from the Khotanese Saka term for "deep blue", āššɪna.

According to the American Heritage Dictionary, the word Türk meant "strong" in Old Turkic; though Gerhard Doerfer supports this theory, Gerard Clauson points out that "the word Türk is never used in the generalized sense of 'strong'" and that the noun Türk originally meant "'the culminating point of maturity' (of a fruit, human being, etc.), but more often used as an [adjective] meaning (of a fruit) 'just fully ripe'; (of a human being) 'in the prime of life, young, and vigorous'". Hakan Aydemir (2022) also contends that Türk originally did not mean "strong, powerful" but "gathered; united, allied, confederated" and was derived from Pre-Proto-Turkic verb *türü 'heap up, collect, gather, assemble'.

The name as used by the Göktürks only applied to themselves (i.e. the Göktürk khanates), their subjects, and splinter groups. The Göktürks did not consider other Turkic speaking groups such as the Uyghurs, Tiele, and Kyrgyz to be Türks. In the Orkhon inscriptions, the Toquz Oghuz and the Yenisei Kyrgyz are not referred to as Türks. Similarly, the Uyghurs called themselves Uyghurs and used Türk exclusively for the Göktürks, whom they portrayed as enemy aliens in their royal inscriptions. Chinese historiographers transcribed the Khazars' name as Tūjué Kěsà bù 突厥可薩部 and Tūjué Hésà 突厥曷薩, whose element Tūjué 突厥 suggests that the Khazars might have kept the Göktürk tradition alive. When tribal leaders built their khanates, ruling over assorted tribes and tribal unions, the collected people identified themselves politically with the leadership. Turk became the designation for all subjects of the Turk empires. Nonetheless, subordinate tribes and tribal unions retained their original names, identities, and social structures. Memory of the Göktürks and the Ashina had faded by the turn of the millennium. The Karakhanids, Qocho Uyghurs, and Seljuks did not claim descent from the Göktürks.

== History ==
=== Origins ===
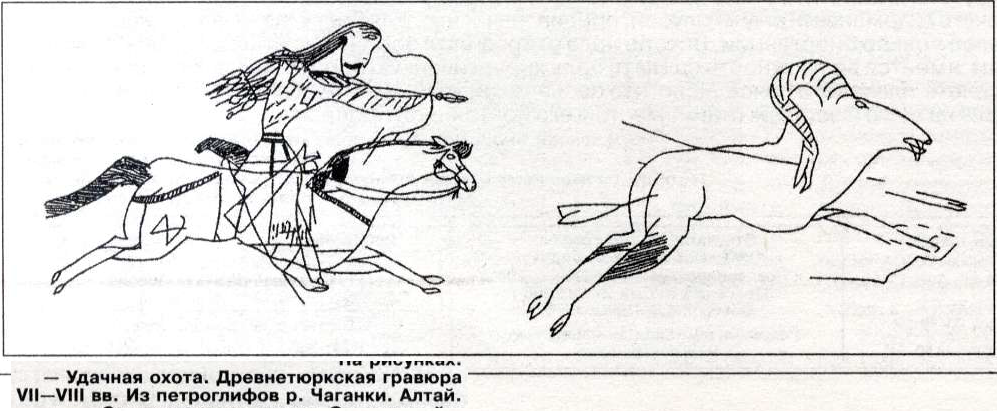
Hunting scene from the Göktürk period, from Chaganka, Altai region, 5th-6th century CE

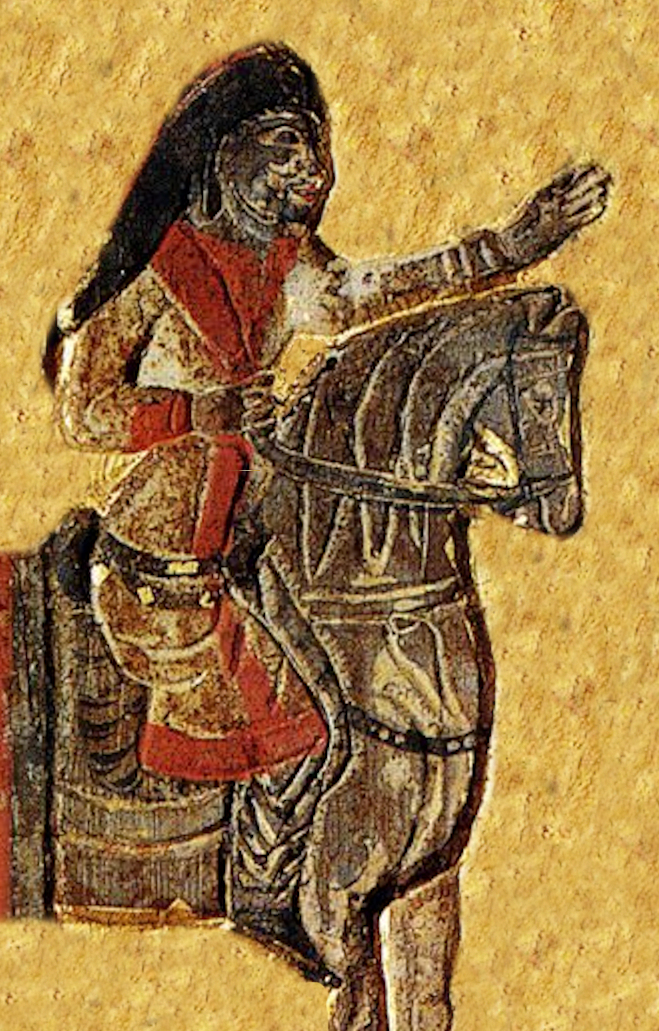
Turkic horseman (Tomb of An Jia, 579 CE).

The Göktürk rulers originated from the Ashina clan, who were first attested to in 439. The Book of Sui reports that on 18 October 439, the Tuoba ruler Emperor Taiwu of Northern Wei overthrew Juqu Mujian of the Northern Liang in eastern Gansu, whence 500 Ashina families fled northwest to the Rouran Khaganate in the vicinity of Gaochang.

According to the Book of Zhou and History of the Northern Dynasties, the Ashina clan was a component of the Xiongnu confederation, specifically, the northern Xiongnu tribes or southern Xiongnu "who settled along the northern Chinese frontier", according to Edwin G. Pulleyblank. However, this view is contested. Göktürks were also posited as having originated from an obscure Suo state (索國) (MC: *sâk) which was situated north of the Xiongnu and had been founded by the Sakas or Xianbei. According to the Book of Sui and the Tongdian, they were "mixed Hu (barbarians)" (雜胡) from Pingliang (平涼), now in Gansu, Northwest China. Pointing to the Ashina's association with the northern tribes of the Xiongnu, some researchers (e.g. Duan, Lung, etc.) proposed that Göktürks belonged in particular to the Tiele confederation, likewise Xiongnu-associated, by ancestral lineage. However, Lee and Kuang (2017) state that Chinese sources do not describe the Ashina-led Göktürks as descending from the Dingling or belonging to the Tiele confederation.

Chinese sources linked the Hu on their northern borders to the Xiongnu just as Graeco-Roman historiographers called the Pannonian Avars, Huns and Hungarians, "Scythians". Such archaizing was a common literary topos, implying similar geographic origins and nomadic lifestyle but not direct filiation.

As part of the heterogeneous Rouran Khaganate, the Turks lived for generations north of the Altai Mountains, where they 'engaged in metal working for the Rouran'. According to Denis Sinor, the rise to power of the Ashina clan represented an 'internal revolution' in the Rouran Khaganate rather than an external conquest.

According to Charles Holcombe, the early Turk population was rather heterogeneous and many of the names of Turk rulers, including names of the two founding members, may have not been Turkic. This is supported by evidence from the Orkhon inscriptions, which include several non-Turkic lexemes, possibly representing Uralic or Yeniseian words. Peter Benjamin Golden points out that the khaghans of the Turkic Khaganate, the Ashina, who were of an undetermined ethnic origin, adopted Iranian and Tokharian (or non-Altaic) titles. German Turkologist W.-E. Scharlipp points out that many common terms in Turkic are Iranian in origin. Whatever language the Ashina may have spoken originally, they and those they ruled would all speak Turkic, in a variety of dialects, and create, in a broadly defined sense, a common culture.

=== Expansion ===
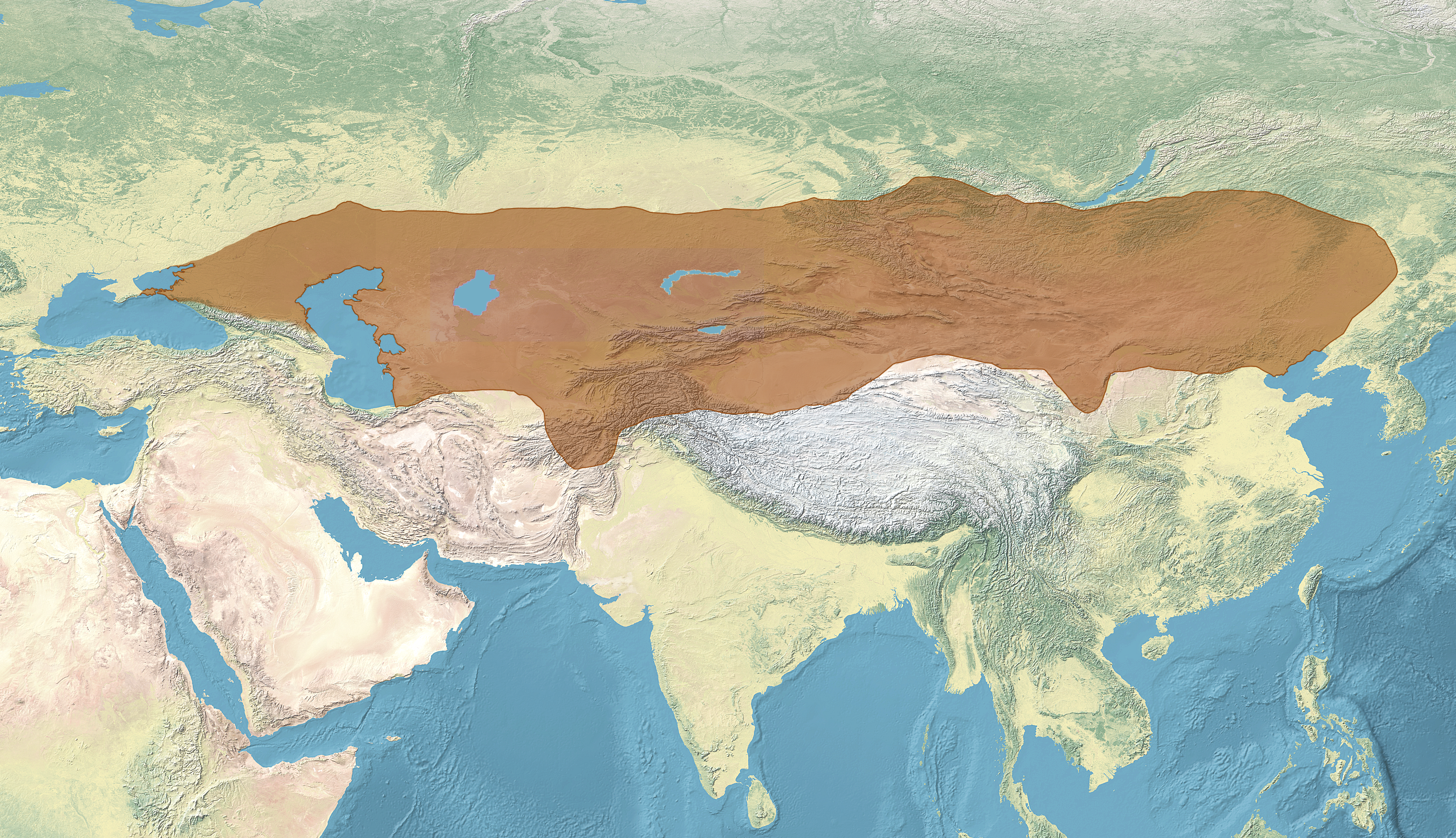
The First Turkic Khaganate and contemporary polities, circa 576

The Göktürks reached their peak in the late 6th century and began to invade the Sui dynasty of China. However, the war ended due to the division of Turkic nobles and their civil war for the title of khagan. With the support of Emperor Wen of Sui, Yami Qaghan won the competition. However, the Göktürk empire was divided into eastern and western empires. Weakened by the civil war, Yami Qaghan declared allegiance to the Sui dynasty. When the Sui began to decline, Shibi Khagan began to assault its territory and even surrounded Emperor Yang of Sui at the Siege of Yanmen (615 AD) with 100,000 cavalry troops. After the collapse of the Sui dynasty, the Göktürks intervened in the ensuing Chinese civil wars, providing support to the northeastern rebel Liu Heita against the rising Tang in 622 and 623. Liu enjoyed a long string of success but was finally routed by Li Shimin and other Tang generals and executed. The Tang dynasty was then established.

=== Conquest by the Tang ===
Although the Göktürk Khaganate had once provided support to the Tang dynasty in the early period of the civil war during the collapse of the Sui dynasty, the conflicts between the Göktürks and the Tang broke out whilst the Tang were gradually reunifying China proper. The Göktürks began to attack and raid the northern border of the Tang Empire and once marched their main force of 100,000 soldiers to Chang'an, the capital of the Tang. Emperor Taizong of Tang, in spite of the limited resources at his disposal, managed to turn them back. Later, Taizong sent his troops to Mongolia and defeated the main force of Göktürk army in Battle of Yinshan four years later and captured Illig Qaghan in 630 AD. With the submission of the Turkic tribes, the Tang conquered the Mongolian Plateau. From then on, the Eastern Turks were subjugated to China.

After a vigorous court debate, Emperor Taizong decided to pardon the Göktürk nobles and offered them positions as imperial guards. However, the proposition was ended by a plan to assassinate the Emperor. On 19 May 639 Ashina Jiesheshuai and his tribesmen directly assaulted Emperor Taizong at Jiucheng Palace (九成宮, in present-day Linyou County, Baoji, Shaanxi). However, they did not succeed and fled north, but were caught by pursuers near the Wei River and were killed. On 13 August 639, following Jiesheshuai's unsuccessful raid, Taizong installed Qilibi Khan and ordered the settled Turkic people to follow him north of the Yellow River to settle between the Great Wall of China and the Gobi Desert. However, many Göktürk generals still remained loyal in service to the Tang Empire.

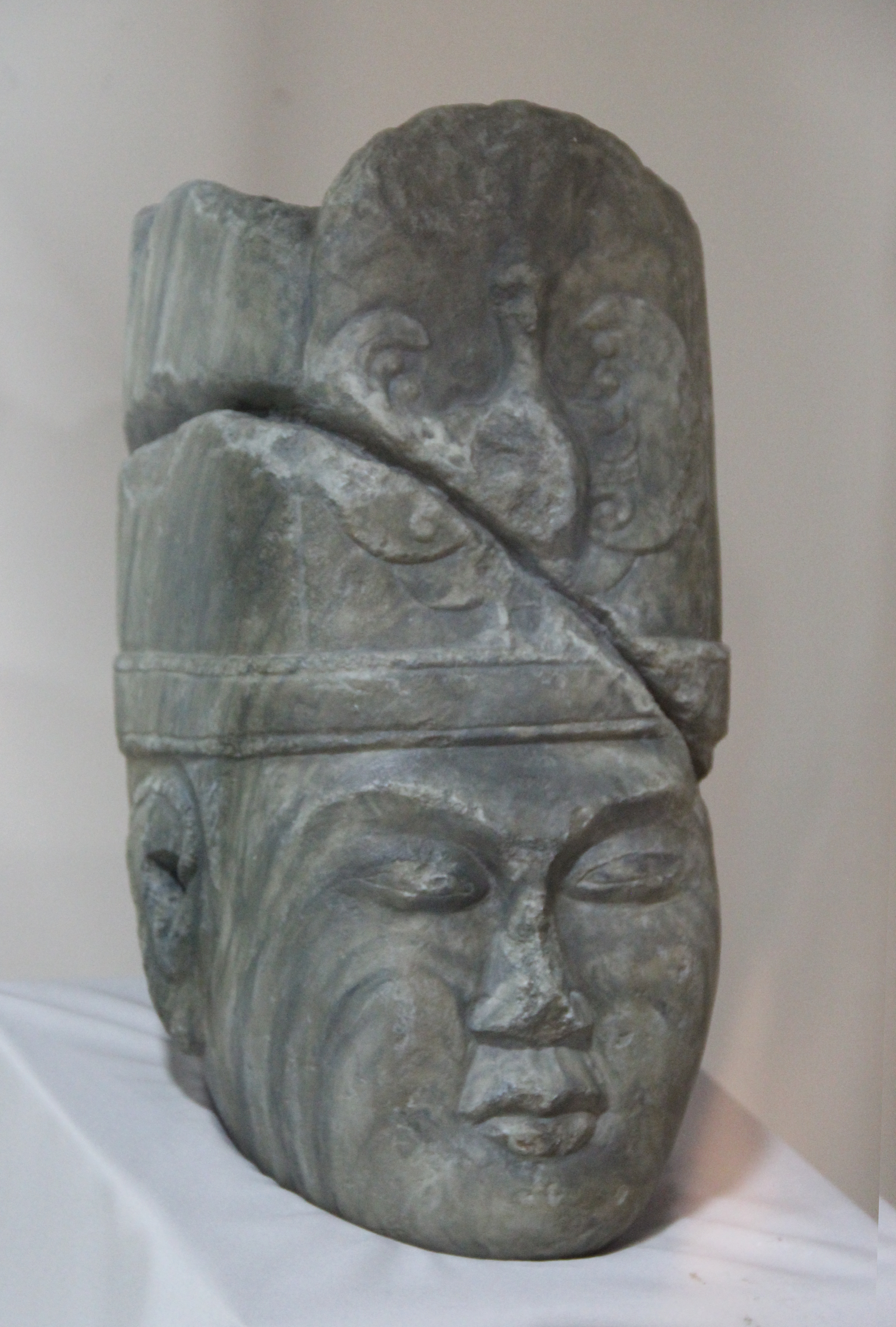
Bust of Kul Tigin (684–731) found in Khashaat, Arkhangai Province, Orkhon River valley, modern-day Mongolia.

=== Revival ===
In 679, Ashide Wenfu and Ashide Fengzhi, who were Turkic leaders of the Chanyu Protectorate (單于大都護府), declared Ashina Nishufu qaghan and revolted against the Tang dynasty. In 680, Pei Xingjian defeated Ashina Nishufu and his army. Ashina Nishufu was killed by his men. Ashide Wenfu made Ashina Funian a qaghan and again revolted against the Tang dynasty. Ashide Wenfu and Ashina Funian surrendered to Pei Xingjian. On 5 December 681, 54 Göktürks, including Ashide Wenfu and Ashina Funian, were publicly executed in the eastern market of Chang'an. In 682, Ilterish Qaghan and Tonyukuk revolted and occupied Heisha Castle (northwest of present-day Hohhot, Inner Mongolia) with the remnants of Ashina Funian's men. They restored the Göktürk Khaganate and intervened in the war between the Tang and Khitan tribes. However, after the death of Bilge Qaghan, the Göktürks could no longer subjugate other Turkic tribes in the grasslands. In 744, allied with the Tang dynasty, the Uyghur Khaganate defeated the last Göktürk Khaganate and controlled the Mongolian Plateau.

== Rulers ==
The Ashina tribe of the Göktürks ruled the First Turkic Khaganate, which then split into the Eastern Turkic Khaganate and the Western Turkic Khaganate, and later the Second Turkic Khaganate, controlling much of Central Asia and the Mongolian Plateau between 552 and 745. The rulers were called "qaghans".

== Religion ==
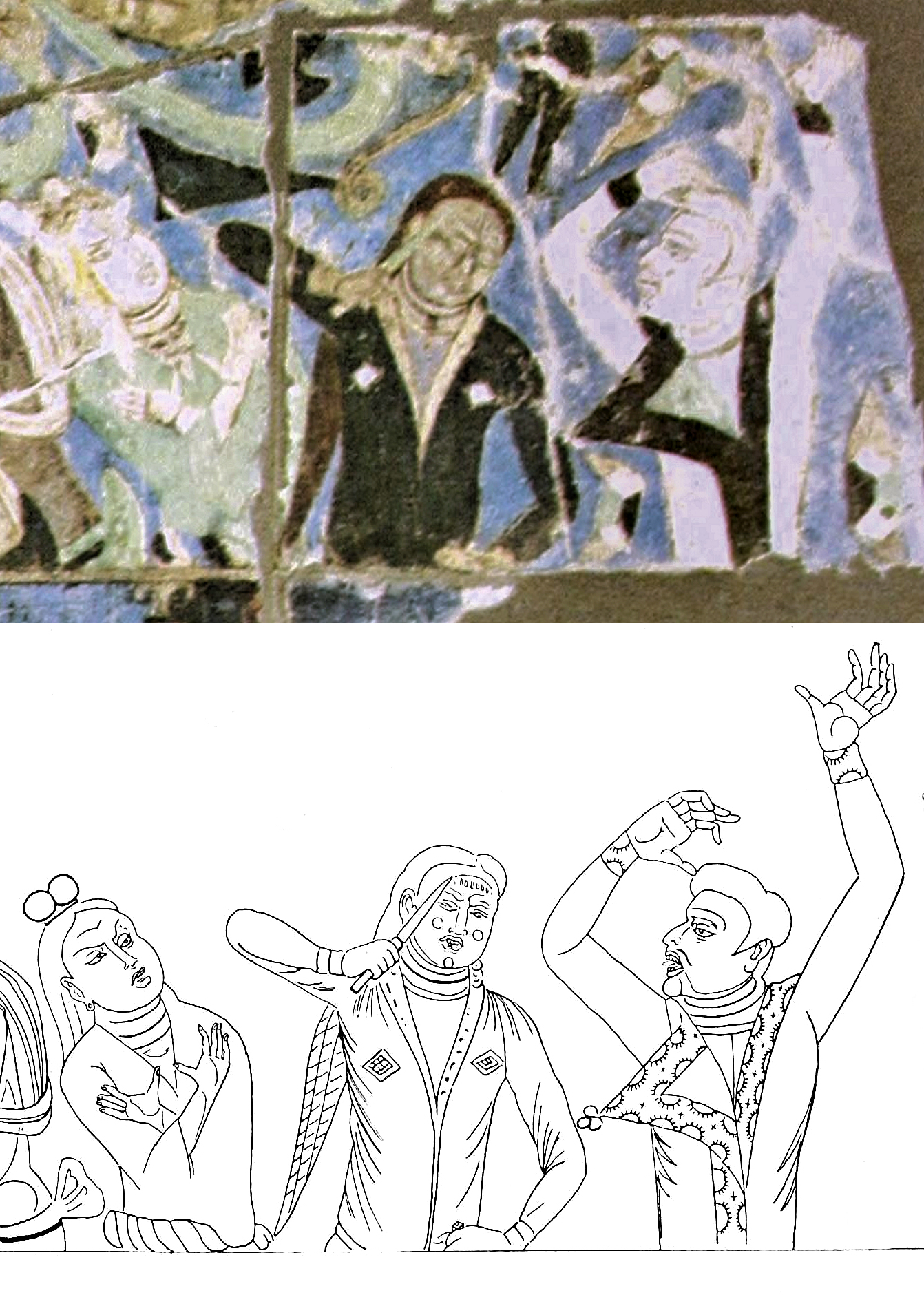
A Turk (center) mourning the Buddha, surrounded by Tocharians. Kizil Caves, Mingoi, Maya cave, 550–600 CE.

Their religion was polytheistic. The great god was the sky, Tengri, who dispensed the viaticum for the journey of life (qut) and fortune (ulug) and watched over the cosmic order and the political and social order. People prayed to him and sacrificed to him a white horse as the offering. The khagan, who came from him and derived his authority from him, was raised on a felt saddle to meet him.

Tengri issued decrees, brought pressure to bear on human beings, and enforced capital punishment, often by striking the offender with lightning. The many secondary powers – sometimes named deities, sometimes spirits or simply said to be sacred, and almost always associated with Tengri were the Earth, the Mountain, Water, the Springs, and the Rivers; the possessors of all objects, particularly of the land and the waters of the nation; trees, cosmic axes, and sources of life; fire. The symbol of the family and alterego of the shaman; the stars, particularly the sun and the moon, the Pleiades, and Venus, whose image changes over time.

Umay, the mother goddess who is none other than the placenta; the threshold and the doorjamb; personifications of Time, the Road, Desire, etc.; heroes and ancestors embodied in the banner, in tablets with inscriptions, and in idols; and spirits wandering or fixed in Penates or in all kinds of holy objects. These and other powers have an uneven force which increases as objects accumulate, as trees form a forest, stones form a cairn, arrows form a quiver, and drops of water form a lake.

== Legacy ==
Members of the Turk-led Ashina dynasty also ruled the Basmyls, and the Karluk Yabghu State; and possibly also the Khazars and Karakhanids (if the first Karakhanid ruler Bilge Kul Qadir Khan indeed descended from the Karluk Yabghus). According to some researchers, the Second Bulgarian Empire's Asen dynasty might be descendants of Ashina. The Kyrgyz subgroup of Türkatalar claim to be direct descendants of the Göktürks and to have inherited their name.

== Gallery ==
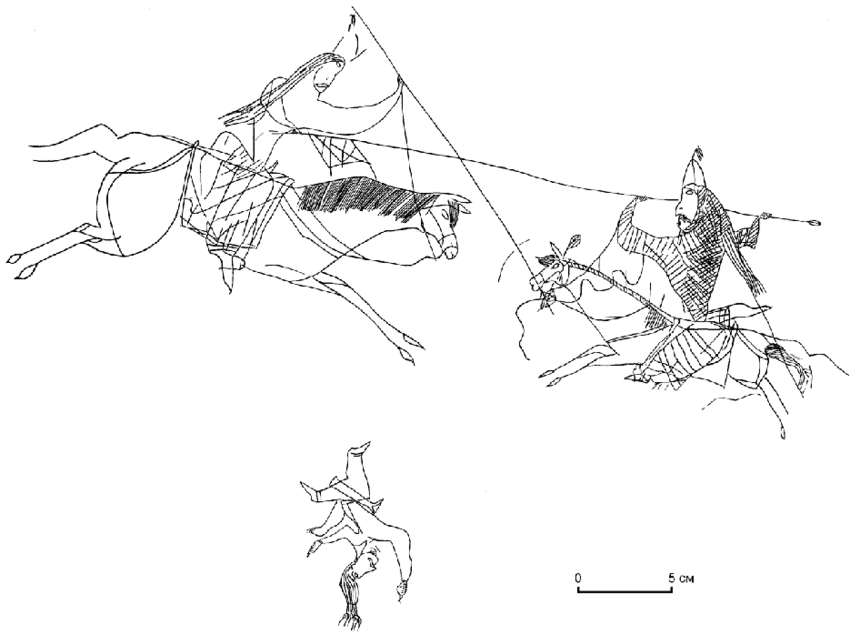
Battle scene depicting Turkic horsemen, typical braided hair style, Chaganka, Altai region, 5th–6th century CE

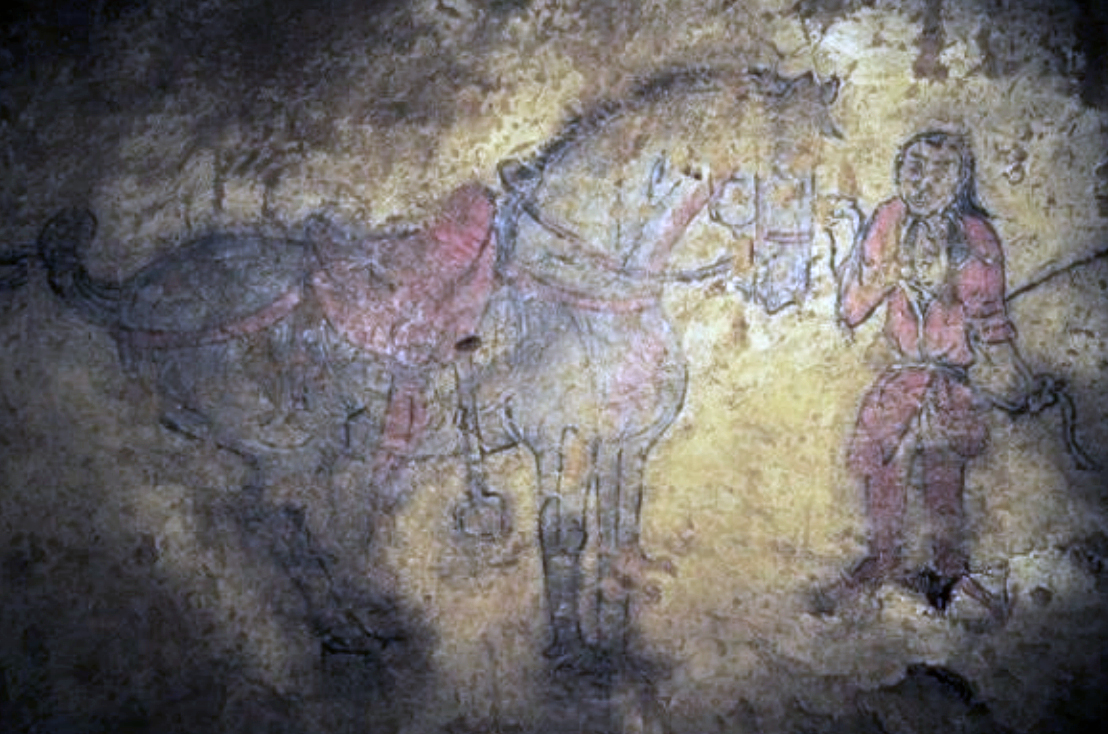
Shoroon Bumbagar tomb mural, Göktürk, 7th century CE, Mongolia

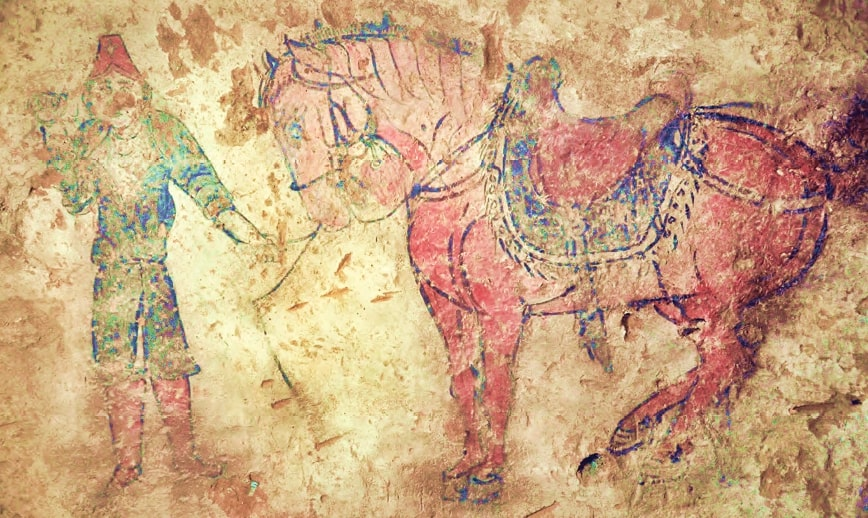
Göktürk cavalry mural, Shoroon Bumbagar tomb, 7th century CE.

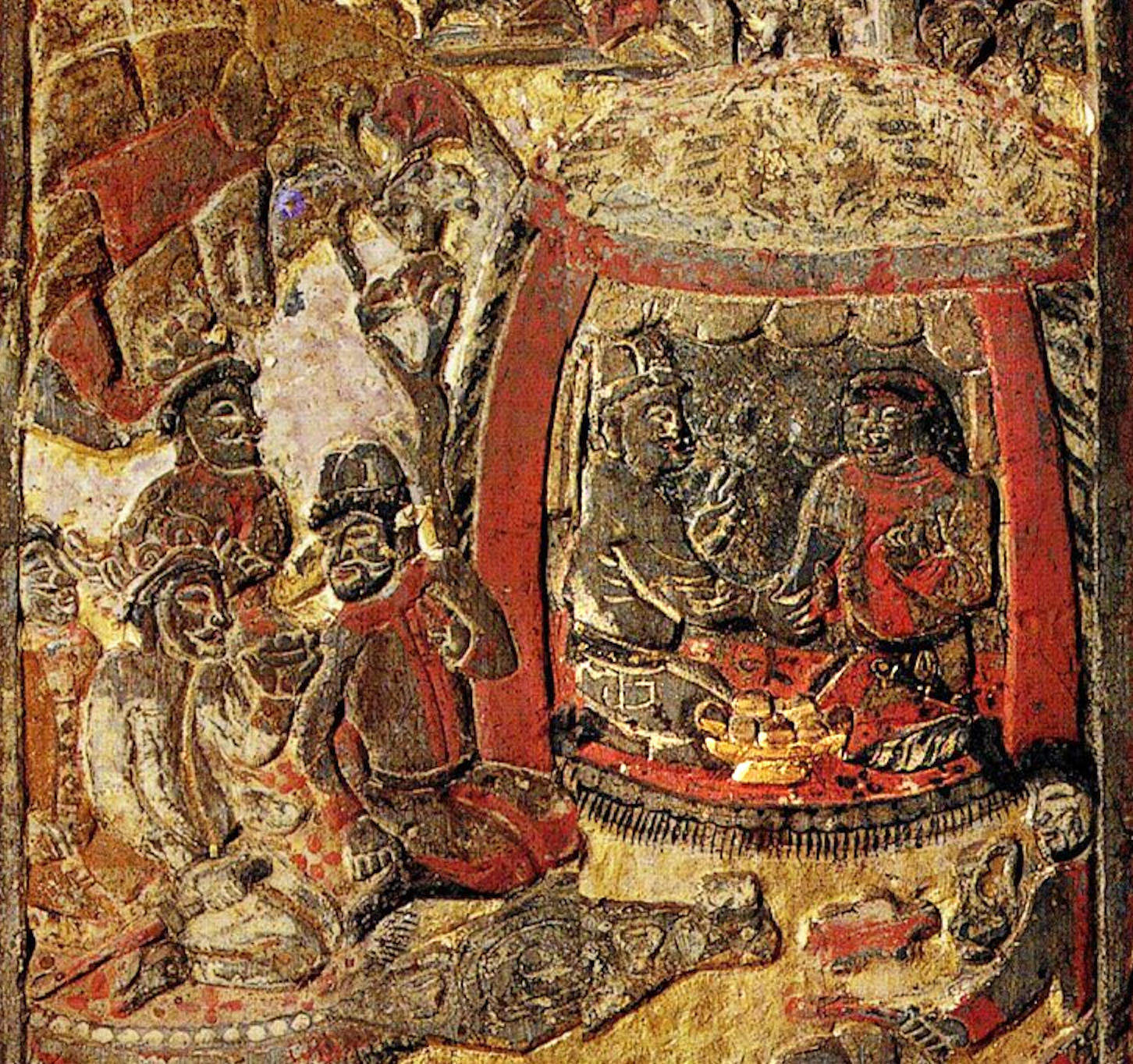
The Sogdian merchant An Jia with a Turkic Chieftain in his yurt.

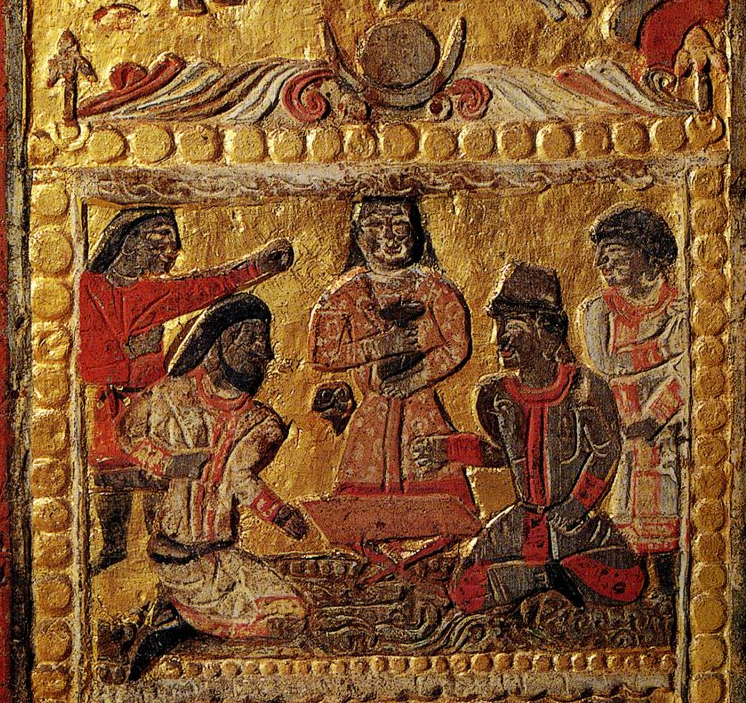
An Jia (right) brokering an alliance with Turks (left).

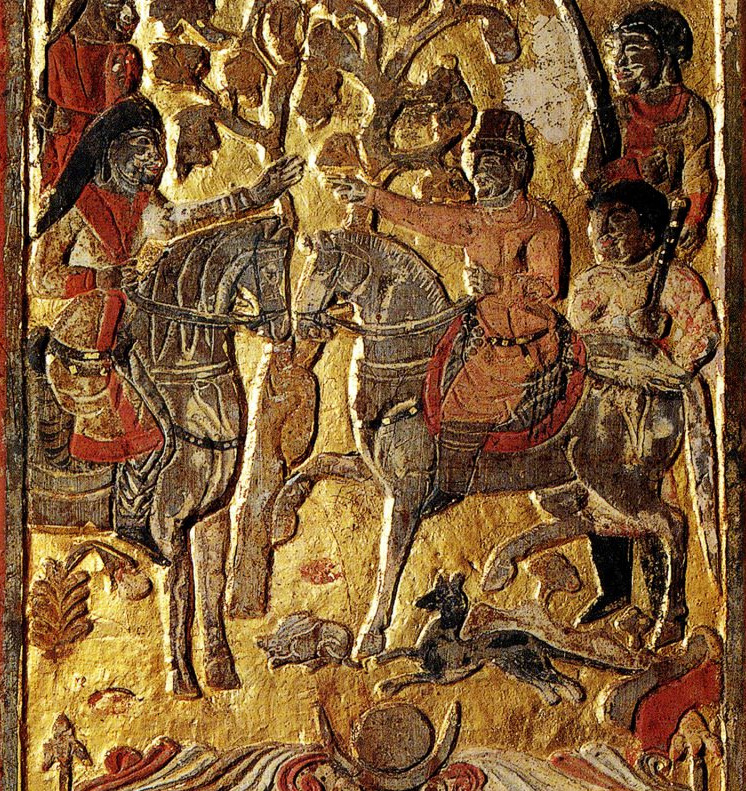
Panel from the Tomb of Anjia, a Sogdian trader (right), who is shown welcoming a Turkic leader (left, with long hair combed in the back). 579 CE, Xi'an, China.

== See also ==
- Göktürk family tree
- Horses in East Asian warfare
- Khazars
- Timeline of the Turkic peoples (500–1300)
- Silver Deer of Bilge Qaghan

== In popular culture ==
- Kürşat, fictional character based on Göktürk prince Ashina Jiesheshuai
- Göktürk-1, Göktürk-2, Göktürk-3 satellites named after Göktürks
- Gokturk exoplanet named after Gökturks

== Sources ==
- Christian, David (1998). A History of Russia, Central Asia and Mongolia, Vol. 1: Inner Eurasia from Prehistory to the Mongol Empire. Malden, MA: Blackwell. ISBN 978-0-631-20814-3.
- Damgaard, P. B.; et al. (9 May 2018). "137 ancient human genomes from across the Eurasian steppes". Nature. 557 (7705). Nature Research: 369–373. Bibcode:2018Natur.557..369D. doi:10.1038/s41586-018-0094-2. hdl:1887/3202709. PMID 29743675. S2CID 13670282.
- Findley, Carter Vaughn (2004). The Turks in World History. Oxford University Press. ISBN 978-0-19-988425-4.
- Golden, Peter (1992). An Introduction to the History of the Turkic Peoples: Ethnogenesis and State-Formation in Medieval and Early Modern Eurasia and the Middle East. Wiesbaden: Otto Harrassowitz. ISBN 978-3-447-03274-2.
- Golden, Peter B. (August 2018). "The Ethnogonic Tales of the Türks". The Medieval History Journal. 21 (2): 291–327. doi:10.1177/0971945818775373. S2CID 166026934.
- Golden, Peter Benjamin (2011). "Ethnogenesis in the tribal zone: The Shaping of the Turks". Studies on the Peoples and Cultures of the Eurasian Steppes. București: Ed. Acad. Române. ISBN 978-973-1871-96-7.
- Grousset, René (1970) [French orig. published 1939]. The Empire of the Steppes: A History of Central Asia. Translated by Naomi Walford. New Brunswick: Rutgers University Press. ISBN 0-8135-1304-9.
- Gumilev, Lev (2004) [Orig. published 1967]. Drevnie tiurki Древние тюрки [The ancient Turks] (in Russian). Moscow: AST. ISBN 9785170247936.
- Holcombe, Charles (2001). The Genesis of East Asia, 221 B.C.–A.D. 907. University of Hawaii Press. ISBN 978-0-8248-2465-5.
- Kliashtorny, S. G. (1977). "Tiurkskiĭ kaganat" Тюркский каганат [Turkic Khaganate]. Bolʹshaia sovetskaia ėntsiklopediia Большая советская энциклопедия [Great Soviet Encyclopedia] (in Russian). Vol. 26 (3rd ed.). Moscow: Sovetskaia ėntsiklopediia. Archived from the original on 16 May 2005.
- Nechaeva, Ekaterina (2011). "The 'Runaway' Avars and Late Antique Diplomacy". In Mathisen, Ralph W.; Shanzer, Danuta (eds.). Romans, Barbarians, and the Transformation of the Roman World: Cultural Interaction and the Creation of Identity in Late Antiquity. Ashgate. pp. 175–181. ISBN 978-0-7546-6814-5.
- Skaff, Jonathan Karem (2009). Nicola Di Cosmo (ed.). Military Culture in Imperial China. Harvard University Press. ISBN 978-0-674-03109-8.
- Sinor, Denis, ed. (1990). The Cambridge History of Early Inner Asia. Cambridge University Press. ISBN 978-0-521-24304-9.
- Tasar, Eren; Frank, Allen J.; Eden, Jeff, eds. (2021). From the Khan's Oven: Studies on the History of Central Asian Religions in Honor of Devin Deweese. BRILL. ISBN 978-90-04-47018-7.
- Wechsler, Howard J. (1979). "T'ai-Tsung (Reign 626–49): The Consolidator". In Twitchett, Denis; Fairbank, John (eds.). The Cambridge History of China, Volume 3: Sui and T'ang China Part I. Cambridge University Press. ISBN 978-0-521-21446-9.
- West, Barbara A. (2008), Encyclopedia of the Peoples of Asia and Oceania
- Wink, André (2002). Al-Hind: The Making of the Indo-Islamic World. Brill. ISBN 0-391-04173-8.
- Xue, Zongzheng (1992). Tujue shi 突厥史 [A history of the Turks] (in Chinese). Beijing: Chinese Social Sciences Press. ISBN 7-5004-0432-8.
- Yang, Xiao-Min; Meng, Hai-Liang; Zhang, Jian-Lin (17 November 2023). "Ancient genome of Empress Ashina reveals the Northeast Asian origin of Göktürk Khanate". Journal of Systematics and Evolution. 61 (6): 1056–1064. doi:10.1111/jse.12938. ISSN 1674-4918. S2CID 255690237.
- Zhu, Xueyuan (2004). Zhongguo bei fang zhu zu de yuan liu 中国北方诸族的源流 [The origins of the ethnic groups of northern China] (in Chinese). Beijing: Zhonghua Shuju. ISBN 7-101-03336-9.
- Zuev, Yu. A. (2002). Rannie tiurki: ocherki istorii i ideologii Ранние тюрки: очерки истории и идеологии [Early Turks: essays on history and ideology] (in Russian). Almaty: Daik-Press. OCLC 52976103.
