= Ashina Jiesheshuai =

Göktürk general and noble (d. 639)

- Shad
- Full name: Ashina Jiesheshuai (阿史那結社率 or 阿史那結射率) or Ashina Jieshe'er (阿史那結社爾)
- Born: Unknown
- Died: 19 May 639; Near Yellow River
- Noble family: Ashina
- Father: Shibi Khan
- Occupation: Military commander of Tang dynasty (630–639)

Ashina Jiesheshuai (Chinese: 阿史那結社率; pinyin: Āshǐnà Jiéshèshuài; Wade–Giles: Ashihna Chieh-she-shuai; Middle Chinese (Guangyun) pronunciation: [ʔɑʃi̯ə˥nɑ˩ kiet.ʑi̯a˥ʃi̯ue̯t]; died 19 May 639) was a member of the Ashina clan of the Eastern Turkic Khaganate and military general (Zhonglangjiang) of the Tang dynasty.

== Background ==
Ashina Jiesheshuai was one of Shibi Qaghan's sons and the younger brother of Ashina Shibobi, who was a vassal qaghan appointed by the Tang dynasty and used the title Tölis Khaghan. (Chinese: 突利可汗).

The Tang dynasty defeated the Eastern Turkic Khaganate, which became a vassal state in 630. During this period, some Turkic nobles were members of the Tang army. Ashina Jiesheshuai was among these nobles.

== Jiucheng Palace raid ==
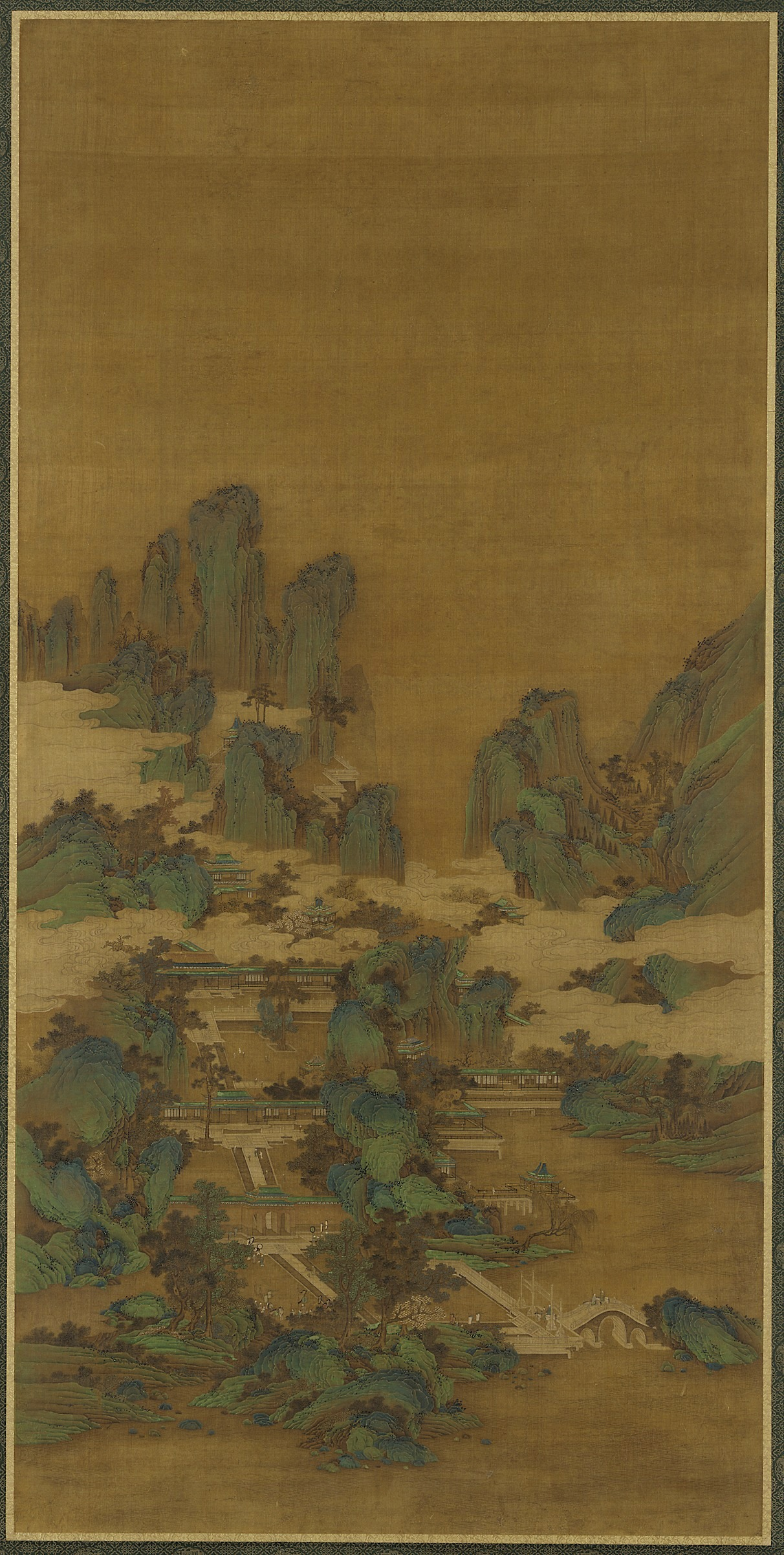
Emperor Taizong Arriving at the Jiucheng Palace (print c. 1500).

By the summer of 639, Ashina Jiesheshuai had lost favor with Emperor Taizong (as he had falsely accused his brother Ashina Shibobi of treason, which Emperor Taizong found despicable). He formed a conspiracy with Ashina Shibobi's son Ashina Hexiangu (Chinese: 阿史那賀暹鶻) to assassinate Emperor Taizong at the Palace of Nine Perfections (九成宮, in modern Linyou County, Shaanxi). They had planned to wait for Li Zhi, Prince of Jin, to depart from the palace in the morning and use that opportunity to attack the palace. On the day they planned, 19 May, Li Zhi did not leave the palace due to a storm. Ashina Jiesheshuai attacked the palace anyway, engaging the palace guards, but the guards were supported by troops who came outside. Ashina Jiesheshuai and his comrades stole some 20 horses from the stable. They fled to the north, but were caught by near the Wei River and killed. Ashina Hexiangu was exiled to Lingbiao.

== Aftermath ==
After this incident, officials began advocating sending the Turks away from the heart of the state. In the fall of 639, Emperor Taizong made a Turkic prince who had served him faithfully, Li Simo (né Ashina Simo) khan of a newly recreated Eastern Turkic Khaganate as Qilibi Khan, giving him all of the Turkic and Hu who had surrendered as his subordinates, to be settled north of the Great Wall and the Yellow River. The Turks were fearful of the Xueyantuo and initially refused to go to their new location. Emperor Taizong issued an edict to Xueyantuo's khan Yi'nan that he and Li Simo keep their peace and not attack each other, and after receiving assurance Yi'nan of the Xueyantuo that he would not attack, the Turks moved to the new location.

== Cultural influences ==
A prominent Turkish nationalist, Nihal Atsız, used some characteristics of Ashina Jiesheshuai for a fictional character named Kür Şad in the novel Bozkurtların Ölümü (The Deaths of Gray Wolves). However, in the novel, the father of Kürşad is not Shibi Khan but Ashina Xichun (Çuluk Kağan).

== See also ==
- Tang campaign against the Eastern Turks#Aftermath in Mongolia
- Turks in the Tang military
