= Abd Allah ibn Suhayl =

Companion (Sahabi) of the Prophet Muhammad

- Born: Mecca
- Died: 632; Al-Yamama
- Known for: Cleverly riding with his father and the idolaters into Badr and then going to the Muslims
- Father: Suhayl ibn Amr
- Relatives: Abu Jandal ibn Suhayl (brother)
- Family: Banu Amir ibn Lu'ayy (Quraish)

Abd Allah ibn Suhayl (Arabic: عبد الله بن سهيل) is an early companion of Muhammad who emigrated to Medina using a clever tactic at the Battle of Badr. He is also the son of the famous Qurayshite statesman, Suhayl ibn Amr and brother of Abu Jandal ibn Suhayl.

== Life ==
Abdullah ibn Suhayl was born in approximately 594 and was the son of Suhayl ibn Amr from Banu Amir branch. His mother is Fakhita bint Amir ibn Nawfal.

== Biography ==
Abdullah had become a Muslim before the Battle of Badr, but did not have a way to join the Muslims in Medina. Leaving Mecca and being openly Muslim was difficult for Abdullah because of the powerful influence of his father and his esteemed place in Quraysh. Abdullah concocted a plan to switch sides and join forces with the Muslims at Badr. He rode to Badr with the rest of the pagan Quraysh and his father and waited until the two forces camped close enough to each other that they were both within eyesight of each other. With the Muslim camp so close, Abdullah escaped to the side of Muhammad and fought alongside them the next day.

His relatively early conversion to Islam and his participation in the Battle of Badr as a Muslim places him in the esteemed position of the Sahabah. He is said to have emigrated to Ethiopia in the first migration. Abdullah ibn Suhayl also participated in the Battle of Uhud, the Battle of the Trench, and the Battle of Yamama.

== Death ==
Abdullah was martyred at the Battle of Yamama at 38 years old in 632 CE. His brother in law, Abu Hudhayfa ibn 'Utba, foster nephew, Salim Mawla Abu Hudhayfa, and second cousin, Zayd ibn al-Khattab were all killed seconds after him. After his death, Khalid ibn al-Walid said that he had fulfilled his duty and that God's messenger was pleased with him when he died, and prayed for him to go to the highest heaven. He was mourned deeply by his brother, Abu Jandal ibn Suhayl and his father, Suhayl ibn Amr. His father would sometimes pray to Allah to grant mercy and to bestow his grace to Abdullah.
