= Stephen C. Stearns =

American biologist (born 1946)

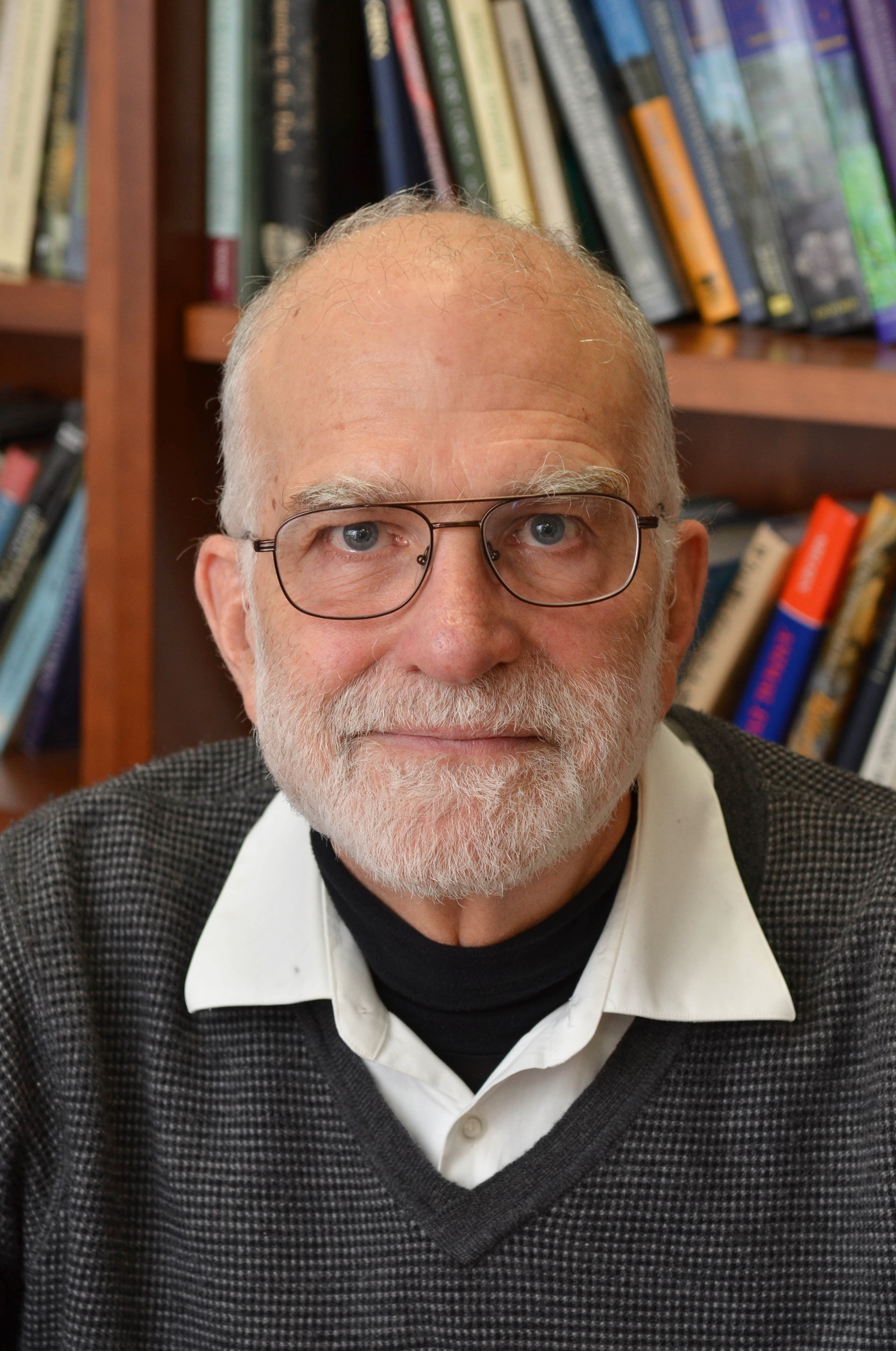
- Born: December 12, 1946 (age 79); Kapaau, Hawaii, United States
- Education: Yale University, University of Wisconsin, University of British Columbia
- Known for: Life history evolution, evolutionary medicine
- Spouse: Beverly Peterson Stearns
- Children: Justin K. Stearns, Jason Stearns
- Scientific career
- Fields: Evolutionary biology, life history theory, evolutionary medicine
- Workplaces: Department of Ecology and Evolutionary Biology at Yale University
- Thesis: A comparison of the evolution and expression of life history traits in stable and fluctuating environments: Gambusia affinis in Hawaii (1975)
- Doctoral students: Dieter Ebert
- Website: stearnslab.yale.edu

Stephen C. Stearns (born December 12, 1946) is an American biologist, and the Edward P. Bass Professor of Ecology and Evolutionary Biology Emeritus at Yale University. He is known for his foundational contributions to life history theory and for his central role in establishing evolutionary medicine as a discipline.

== Early life and education ==
Stearns was born in Kapaau, Hawaii and raised in Hawi, Hawaii. He completed his Bachelor of Arts degree at Yale University in 1967, earned a Master of Science degree at the University of Wisconsin, Madison in 1971, and received his PhD from the University of British Columbia in 1975. He was subsequently awarded a Miller Fellowship at the University of California, Berkeley, which he held in 1975-76 and again in 1977-78.

== Career ==
Stearns began his academic career as an Assistant Professor in the Department of Biology at Reed College, where he served from 1978 to 1983. He then moved to Europe, joining the University of Basel as Professor of Zoology - a position he held for nearly two decades, from 1983 to 2000. During this period he also took on significant leadership roles: he served as Dean of the Faculty of Science from 1995 to 1996, and chaired the European Science Foundation Program in Population Biology from 1994 to 1998.

His years at Basel also gave rise to several lasting institutional contributions to the field. In 1986, he founded the Journal of Evolutionary Biology and served as its first managing editor until 1991, later joining its Editorial Board. In 1987, he was a co-founder of the European Society for Evolutionary Biology (ESEB), subsequently serving on its council and as its president from 1997 to 1999. He served as Vice President of the Society for the Study of Evolution. In 1991, he and Tim Clutton-Brock co-founded the Tropical Biology Association, of which Stearns served as President from 1991 to 1998 and Treasurer from 1998 to 2000. During 1993, he held the European Chair of Biology at the École normale supérieure in Paris.

During his time at Basel, Stearns also mentored a remarkable cohort of researchers. His PhD students included Jacob Koella, now a professor at the University of Neuchâtel; Dieter Ebert, now a professor at the University of Basel; Tadeusz Kawecki, now a professor at the University of Lausanne; Barbara Hellriegel, now a senior lecturer at ZHAW Zurich University of Applied Sciences; and Martin Ackermann, now Director of Eawag and Professor of Microbial Systems Ecology at ETH Zurich and EPFL. His MSc students included Thomas Flatt, now Professor of Evolutionary Biology at the University of Fribourg. His postdoctoral associates included Michael Doebeli, now a professor at the University of British Columbia, and Barbara König, now Professor Emeritus at the University of Zurich. Among the members in his research group were Christophe Boesch, who went on to become a founding director of the Max Planck Institute for Evolutionary Anthropology, retiring in 2019 and passing away in 2024; Fritz Vollrath, subsequently Professor of Zoology at the University of Aarhus and now Visiting Research Professor at the University of Oxford; Paul Schmid-Hempel, subsequently Professor of Experimental Ecology at ETH Zurich, now emeritus; Arie van Noordwijk, now Emeritus Senior Scientist at the Netherlands Institute of Ecology (NIOO-KNAW) in Wageningen; and Bruno Baur, now Professor Emeritus of Conservation Biology at the University of Basel. At Reed College, his senior thesis students included Susan Alberts, now the Robert F. Durden Distinguished Professor of Biology and Evolutionary Anthropology and Chair of the Department of Evolutionary Anthropology at Duke University, and an elected member of the National Academy of Sciences.

In 2000, Stearns returned to Yale University as the Edward P. Bass Professor of Ecology and Evolutionary Biology. From 2002 to 2005, he chaired the Department of Ecology and Evolutionary Biology. He continued to expand the field of evolutionary medicine, and in 2013 founded the open-access journal Evolution, Medicine, and Public Health, serving as its editor-in-chief until 2016. He also served on the editorial boards of the Quarterly Review of Biology (from 1993), Animal Conservation (1997–2002), the Journal of Evolutionary Biology (2000–2003), and Evolutionary Applications (2007–2011). His research during this period examined natural selection in contemporary human populations and the influence of the demographic transition on fitness variation. He served as President of the International Society for Evolution, Medicine, and Public Health from 2017 to 2018.

Committed to broad public education, Stearns made two of his Yale courses freely available online. His evolution and ecology course is available through Open Yale Courses and on YouTube, and his evolutionary medicine course is available on YouTube. Throughout his career he has been recognized as an outstanding teacher, receiving the DeVane Medal for distinction in undergraduate teaching from the Yale chapter of Phi Beta Kappa in 2011, and the Yale College Harwood F. Byrnes/Richard B. Sewall Teaching Prize in 2021.

Now retired, Stearns continues to write and think about evolutionary medicine, contributing to the field he helped create.

== Awards and honors ==
- 1967: Honors in Biology, Yale University
- 1975–1978: Miller Fellow, University of California, Berkeley
- 1987: Elected Fellow of the American Association for the Advancement of Science.
- 1993: European Chair of Biology at the École normale supérieure, Paris.
- 2000: Clarion Award from the Association for Women in Communications for a book he wrote with his wife, Beverly Peterson Stearns, Watching, from the Edge of Extinction.
- 2000: Distinguished Ecologist, University of Michigan.
- 2004: Raymond Pearl Memorial Lecturer, Human Biology Association.
- 2005: Fellow, Konrad Lorenz Institute.
- 2005: Fellow, Rockefeller Bellagio Conference and Study Center.
- 2005: Honorary Member of the Swiss Zoological Society.
- 2007: Fellow, European Society for Evolutionary Biology.
- 2011: DeVane Medal for distinction in undergraduate teaching, Yale University Phi Beta Kappa.
- 2011–2012: Fellow, Wissenschaftskolleg zu Berlin
- 2015: Honorary Doctorate, Faculty of Mathematics and Natural Sciences, University of Zurich.
- 2021: Yale College Harwood F. Byrnes/Richard B. Sewall Teaching Prize
- 2023: Marker Lectures in Evolutionary Biology, Pennsylvania State University

== Selected publications ==
=== Books ===
- The Evolution of Sex and its Consequences (Birkhaeuser 1987) ISBN 978-3-0348-6273-8
- The Evolution of Life Histories (Oxford University Press 1992) ISBN 978-0-19-857741-6
- Evolution in Health and Disease (Oxford University Press 1999, 2nd Ed with Jacob Koella 2007) ISBN 978-0-19-920746-6
- Watching, from the Edge of Extinction (first author Beverly Peterson Stearns, Yale University Press 1999) ISBN 978-0-300-07606-6
- Evolution, an Introduction (with Rolf Hoekstra, Oxford University Press 2000, 2nd Ed 2005) ISBN 978-0-19-925563-4
- Evolutionary Medicine (with Ruslan Medzhitov, Sinauer 2016, 2nd edition Oxford University Press 2024) ISBN 978-0192871985

=== Articles ===
- Stearns, Stephen C. (1976), "Life-history tactics: A review of the ideas", The Quarterly Review of Biology, 51 (1): 3–47, doi:10.1086/409052, JSTOR 2825234, PMID 778893, S2CID 37813334.
- Stearns, Stephen C. (1977), "The evolution of life history traits: A critique of the theory and a review of the data" (PDF), Annual Review of Ecology and Systematics, 8: 145–171, doi:10.1146/annurev.es.08.110177.001045, JSTOR 2096724.
- Stearns, Stephen C.; Koella, Jacob C. (1986), "The evolution of phenotypic plasticity in life-history traits: Predictions of reaction norms for age and size at maturity" (PDF), Evolution, 40 (5): 893–913, doi:10.2307/2408752, JSTOR 2408752, PMID 28556219.
- Stearns, Stephen C. (1989), "The evolutionary significance of phenotypic plasticity", BioScience, 39 (7): 436–445, doi:10.2307/1311135, JSTOR 1311135.
- Stearns, S. C. (1989), "Trade-offs in life-history evolution" (PDF), Functional Ecology, 3 (3): 259–268, Bibcode:1989FuEco...3..259S, doi:10.2307/2389364, JSTOR 2389364.
