= Dieter Ebert =

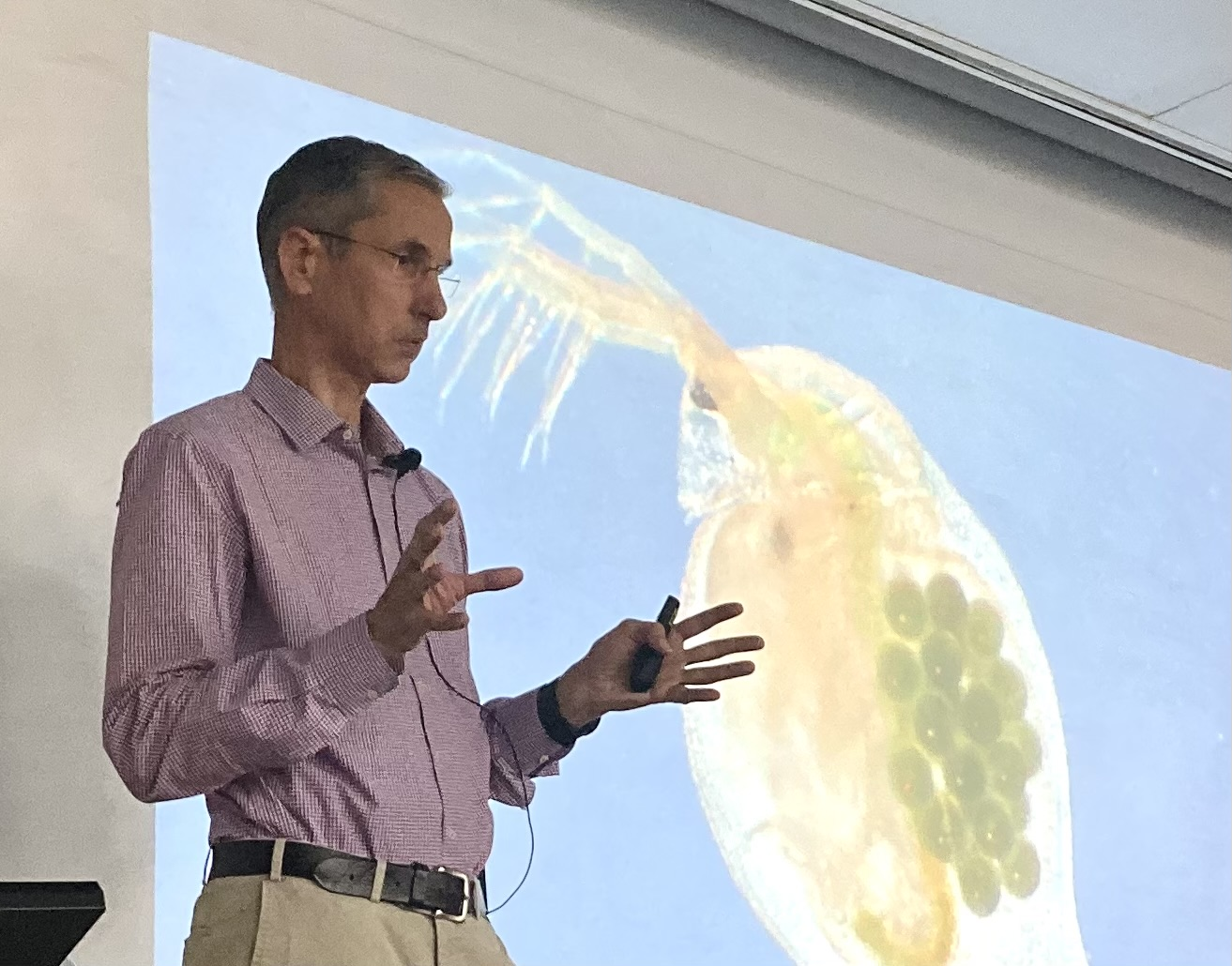
- Born: Germany
- Education: Technical University of Munich (1988)
- Known for: Research on host-parasite interactions coevolution
- Scientific career
- Fields: evolutionary biology genomics ecology of metapopulations
- Workplaces: Department of Environmental Sciences, Zoology, at University of Basel (Switzerland)
- Doctoral advisor: Stephen C. Stearns
- Other academic advisors: Jürgen Jacobs, W. D. Hamilton, John Lawton

Dieter Ebert is professor for Zoology and Evolutionary Biology at the Department of Environmental Science, section Zoology, at the University of Basel in Basel, Switzerland. He is an evolutionary ecologist and geneticist, known for his research on host–pathogen interaction and coevolution, mainly using the model system Daphnia and its parasites.

== Education and academic positions ==
Ebert obtained a diploma in Zoology and Ecology in 1988 from the Technical University of Munich, Germany. During his undergraduate studies he spent a year at the University of South Alabama, Alabama. He did a PhD in Evolutionary Biology in 1991 in the group of Stephen C. Stearns, at the University of Basel, Switzerland. In 1991 Ebert spent six months at the Vavilov Institute of General Genetics in Moscow, Russia. This was followed by a junior research fellowship at the Smithsonian Tropical Research Institute in Panama. In 1992 Ebert joined the research group of William (Bill) Hamilton at the University of Oxford, where he started to work on host - parasite interactions. He did a further postdoc in the NERC Centre for Population Biology (CPB) at Silwood Park with John Lawton, before he became Assistant professor at the University of Basel, Switzerland. In 2001 he became Full Professor at the University of Fribourg, Switzerland, but moved back to the University of Basel in 2004.

== Research ==
Ebert is mostly known for his work on host - parasite coevolution. During his postdoc at Oxford University he developed the Daphnia - parasite system, as a new model for experimental studies. In particular Daphnia magna has become a model system to understand the genetics, evolution and ecology of host-parasite interaction. In natural habitats Daphnia are frequently infected with diverse microparasites, and a number of these parasites can be used as models in the laboratory and the field (see section Parasitism at Daphnia magna) using observational, experimental and genomic approaches.

Besides his work on host – parasite interactions, Ebert and coworkers made important contributions to the study of local adaptation and metapopulation biology.

Work from his research group resulted in a number of important findings.

- Parasites are mostly more virulent in the host population where they evolved, than in other, new populations, which shows, that contrary to the former believe, parasites do not evolve avirulence while adapting to their hosts.
- The Monoculture effects occur also when the host population is not spatially structured, putting emphasize on the absence of a genetic structure of the host population.
- Maternal experience influences resistance of offspring to a bacterial parasite.
- The mass action principle, a widely used tool in epidemiology, was for the first time supported with strong experimental data using Daphnia magna and its bacterial pathogen Pasteuria ramosa
- The coevolution of parasites and their host can be traced in layered pond sediments over several decades and supports the Red Queen hypothesis of coevolution
- Coevolution between D. magna and its parasite Pasteuria ramosa can be traced back million years, as evidenced by the finding of trans-species polymorphisms. For a review see also
- Microbiotas are vital for D. magna too. Without microbiota hosts grow slower, have reduced fecundity and a higher mortality compared to host with microbiota.
- In recent years genetic and genomic tools were used to understand the mode of inheritance, dominance and epistasis of parasite resistance loci in the host genome. At the same time the group of Ebert mapped the location of the resistance gene in the genome and discovered a Supergene with a cluster of three resistance genes in strong physical linkage
- Metapopulations evolve differently. Based on long term observations and genomic analysis, the research group of Dieter Ebert showed that a metapopulation of the waterflea Daphnia magna evolved differently, as compared to the classical model of a large stable population

== Mentoring ==
Ebert is known for having a high rate of placing trainees in academic positions. Previous mentees (former PhD students and postdocs) have gone on to PI positions at institutions around the world, for example Tom Little (University of Edinburgh), Christoph Haag (CNRS, Montpellier), Marco Archetti (University of East Anglia, UK & Penn State University, USA), Florian Altermatt (University of Zürich), Pepijn Luijckx (Trinity College, Dublin), Laurence Mouton (University of Lyon), Sabrina Gaba (INRA Dijon), Karen Haag (University de Rio Grande de Sol, Brazil), Frida Ben-Ami (Tel Aviv University), Mathew Hall (Monash University, Australia), Jason Andras (Mount Holyoke, USA), Anne Roulin (University of Zurich), Hirumo Ito (Nagasaki University, Japan), Marilou Sison-Mangus (University of California, Santa Cruz, USA) and Christina Tadiri (University of Galway, Ireland).

Since 2001, Dieter Ebert is the main organizer of the Guarda summer school in evolutionary biology, a master class for graduate students in evolutionary biology, taking place in the remote Swiss alpine village of Guarda, Switzerland, Canton of Grisons. This summer school was launched by Stephen Stearns in 1987, and had featured an outstanding selection of evolutionary biologist on its faculty, including John Maynard Smith, Georg Williams, W. D. Hamilton, Richard Lenski and Peter and Rosemary Grant.

== Recognition ==
Dieter Ebert is a member of the Academy of Sciences Leopoldina, the European Molecular Biology Organization (EMBO), and is a permanent fellow of the Berlin Institute for Advanced Study. in 2025 Dieter Ebert was elected as a Distinguished Fellow of the European Society for Evolutionary Biology (ESEB) European Society for Evolutionary Biology.
