= Suhayl ibn Amr =

Meccan Quraysh leader (c. 556 – 639)

- سهيل بن عمرو
- Born: c. 556 CE; Mecca, Hejaz, Arabia (present-day Saudi Arabia)
- Died: 639 (aged 82–83); Imwas, Ash-Sham, near Jerusalem, Jund Filastin, Rashidun Caliphate
- Known for: Ambassador of the Quraysh
- Spouses: Fatima bint Abdul-Uzza; Fakhita bint Amir ibn Nawfal; Al-Hunfa' bint Abu Jahl
- Children: daughters: Hindah; Umm Kulthum; Sahlah; sons: Abdullah; Al-‘As (Abu Jandal); Yazid
- Parents: Amr ibn Abd Shams (father); Uzza bint Sufyan (mother)
- Family: Banu Abd Shams (Quraish)
- Military career
- Conflicts: Against Muslims; Battle of Badr (POW); Conquest of Mecca; For Muslims; Battle of the Yarmuk

Suhayl ibn ʿAmr (Arabic: سهيل بن عمرو), also known as Abū Yazīd, was a contemporary of the Islamic prophet Muhammad, and a prominent leader among the Quraysh tribe of Mecca. Clever and articulate, he was known as the Khatib (orator) of his tribe, and his opinion carried great weight among them. He brokered the famous Treaty of al-Hudaybiya with Prophet Muhammad on the side of Quraysh in 628 AD.

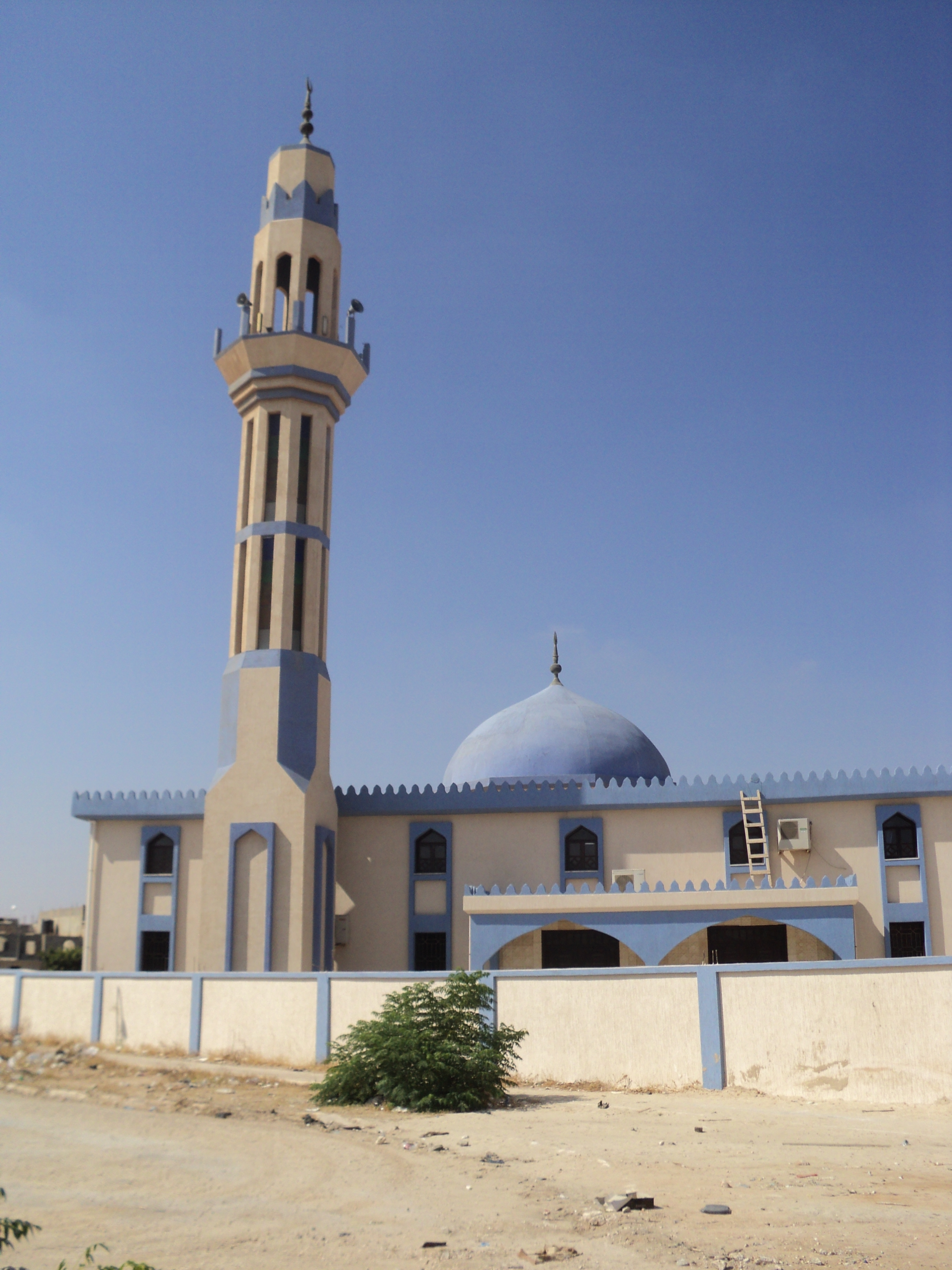
The Suhayl ibn Amr mosque

== Family ==
He was the son of Amr ibn Abd Shams, of the Amir ibn Luayy clan, and Uzza bint Sufyan, from the Umayya clan, both of the Quraysh tribe. He had four half-brothers.

1. Sakran ibn Amr, whose mother was Hiyah bint Qays al-Khuzaiyah. He was the first husband of Sawdah bint Zam'ah and the father of Abdulrahman.
2. Hatib, whose mother was Asma bint al-Harith ibn Nawfal. He was the husband of Rayta bint Alqama and the father of Amr.
3. Sahl, whose mother was also Asma bint al-Harith ibn Nawfal. He was the husband of Safiyya bint Amr ibn Abd al-Wud and the father of Amir.
4. Sulayt, whose mother was Khawla bint Amr ibn al-Harith. He was the husband of Fatima bint Alqama and father of Salit.

Suhayl is described as a tall, fair-skinned, handsome man of pleasant appearance, though he had a cleft lower lip.

He married three times and had several children.

1. Fatima bint Abdul-Uzza
  1. Hind bint Suhail, who married Hasan ibn Ali and was the mother of Yaqoub and Abdurrahman.
  2. Umm Kulthum, who married Abu Sabra ibn Abu Ruhm and was the mother of Sa'd, Sabra, Abdullah and Muhammad.
  3. Sahla bint Suhail, who married Abu Hudhayfa ibn 'Utba and was the mother of Muhammad ibn Abi Hudhayfa.
2. Fakhita bint Amir ibn Nawfal
  1. Abdullah, who married Layla bint Abdullah and was the father of Umar ibn Abdullah and Ubaydullah.
  2. Al-‘As (later known as Abu Jandal), who married Safiya bint Abd al-Uzza and was the father of Jandal and Abd-Allah.
3. Al-Hunfa' bint Abu Jahl.
  1. Yazid, who married Ruqayya bint Abdullah ibn Abi Qays and was the father of Abu al-Hasan and Umm al-Hasan.

== Early Islam ==
Suhayl was one of the elders of Mecca in the earliest days of Islam. He was among those tasked with feeding the pilgrims.

He was one of the leaders who refused to protect Muhammad on his return from Ta'if in 620, saying, "Amir ibn Luayy do not give protection against the clans of Kaab," the latter being the majority of the Quraysh.

In 622, the Quraysh heard that some pilgrims from Medina had met with Muhammad at Aqaba and pledged to fight them. Suhayl and some others pursued the Medinans and captured one of their leaders, Sa'd ibn Ubadah. They tied his hands to his neck with his own belt and dragged him by the hair back to Mecca, beating him as they went. Sa'd said that he expected Suhayl to treat him well, but Suhayl delivered "a violent blow in the face". However, when Sa'd called for help, the Quraysh realised he had allies in Mecca and they let him go.

In 624, Suhayl and his son Abdullah set out with the Quraysh army to meet Abu Sufyan's caravan. When they reached Badr, where Muhammad's army was waiting, Abdullah deserted the Quraysh and joined the Muslim side for the Battle of Badr. During the battle Sa'd ibn Abi Waqqas severed Suhayl’s sciatic nerve with an arrow. Suhayl was among those captured and taken prisoner at the battle. Umar offered to knock out his two front teeth so that "his tongue will stick out and he will never be able to speak against you again;" but Muhammad would not allow it. Suhayl was brought to Medina with his hands roped to his neck. He was brought to the house of his former sister-in-law, Sawda, who recalled: "I could hardly contain myself when I saw Abu Yazid in this state and I said, 'O Abu Yazid, you surrendered too readily! You ought to have died a noble death!'" forgetting that he had been fighting on the side of her opponents. In due course Mikraz ibn Hafs ibn al-Akhyaf came to negotiate Suhayl's ransom, which Muhammad agreed to take in camels. Since Mikraz did not have the animals with him, he remained in Medina as security while Suhayl returned to Mecca to arrange the payment.

Suhayl was instrumental in concluding the Treaty of Hudaybiyyah in 628. He insisted that the treaty be signed from the Muslim side as Muhammad, son of Abdullah (Muhammad ibn Abdullah) rather than the Prophet Muhammad, saying that the Qurayshi side did not accept his prophethood. Before the writing-up was finished, Suhayl's son Abu Jandal appeared, saying he was a Muslim and wanted to go to Medina. Suhayl slapped his face and reminded Muhammad that they had just agreed that no Meccans would be allowed to desert to Medina. Muhammad concurred, and Abu Jandal had to return to Mecca. Umar walked beside him, offering a sword, which he hoped Abu Jandal would use to kill his father; but Abu Jandal did not take it.

Suhayl joined Ikrimah ibn Abi Jahl in Mecca's final resistance against Muhammad at Khandama Pass. However, the resistance was flattened by Khalid ibn al-Walid's cavalry. When Muhammad entered Mecca as a conqueror, Suhayl converted to Islam along with everyone else. Muhammad gave him a gift of a hundred camels "to win over his heart".

He calmed the Muslims in Mecca after the death of Muhammad. He served as commander of a battalion during Yarmuk and served in the army until his death.

== Death ==
Al-Mada'ini reported that Suhayl died as a martyr in the Battle of the Yarmuk. However both Al-Shafi'i and Al-Waqidi held that he died during the Plague of Amwas.

== Sources ==
- Ali, Farrukh B. (1981). "Al-Ḥudaybiya: An Alternative Version". The Muslim World. 71 (1): 47–62. doi:10.1111/j.1478-1913.1981.tb03426.x.
- Goerke, Andreas (2000). "The Historical Tradition about al-Ḥudaybiya: A Study of ʿUrwa B. al-Zubayr's Account". In Motzki, Harald (ed.). The Biography of Muḥammad: The Issue of the Sources. Leiden: Brill. pp. 240–275. ISBN 978-90-04-11513-2.
