= Justin K. Stearns =

- Born: October 13, 1974 (age 51); Hawaii
- Citizenship: United States
- Education: Dartmouth College, Princeton University
- Known for: Scholarship of Al-Hasan al-Yusi, Medieval Islamic ideas about infectious disease
- Spouse: Nathalie Peutz
- Scientific career
- Fields: Islamic history, History of Science, Religion
- Workplaces: New York University Abu Dhabi
- Thesis: Infectious ideas: Contagion in medieval Islamic and Christian thought (2007)
- Academic advisors: William Chester Jordan and Michael Cook

Justin K. Stearns (born October 13, 1974) is an American historian of the Islamic Golden Age. His work focuses on the history of science in the medieval Islamic world, and how the relationship between natural philosophy and fiqh (Islamic jurisprudence) was viewed by writers during that period, particularly in the Maghreb and al-Andalus. He is currently Professor of Arab Crossroads Studies, a multidisciplinary program in the Division of Art and Humanities at New York University Abu Dhabi.

== Early life and education ==
Stearns was born on 13 October 1974 in Hawaii, the elder son of American evolutionary biologist Stephen C. Stearns and Beverly Stearns. He spent his early years in Hawaii prior to family moving to Basel, Switzerland in 1983, when his father took a position at the University of Basel as Professor in the Department of Zoology. He returned to the United States and attended Dartmouth College, received a BA in English and History in 1998. During his senior year at Dartmouth, he received a grant to travel to Morocco and study Arabic, and describes this event as sparking his interest in Middle Eastern history and for Moroccan culture in particular.

He subsequently attended Princeton University, receiving a PhD in Near Eastern Studies in 2007. During this period he worked at Middlebury College in the Department of Religion, and twice was a visiting scholar at the Spanish National Research Council, in the Department of Arabic Studies in Madrid, Spain where he collaborated with Spanish historian of Andalusian history, Maribel Fierro.

== Career ==
After graduating, Stearns took a faculty position at NYU Abu Dhabi, in the Division of Arts and Humanities. From 2020 to 2021 he was a visiting scholar at the Max Planck Institute for the History of Science in Berlin, Germany. He is a member of the editorial board of The British Journal for the History of Science.

Stearns historical work involves translation and analysis of medieval Arabic sources, mostly within the realm of early Islamic philosophy during the Islamic Golden Age, and focuses on the history and development of natural philosophy in the Islamic world, especially during its more rapid periods such as the first plague pandemic and the Black Death. In particular, Stearns is a scholar of the 17th century Moroccan Sufi al-Hasan al-Yusi (1631–1691), and published commentary and the first English translation of the Sufi's famous treatise and partial autobiography al-Muḥāḍarāt fī al-adab wa-l-luġa ("Discourses on Literature and Language", Arabic: المحاضرات في الأدب واللغة), which is considered a representative piece of pre-modern Moroccan cultural identity. In 2020, Stearns' translation was added to the Library of Arabic Literature, which catalogs historically important Arabic texts.

== Personal life ==
Stearns is married to Nathalie Peutz, a cultural anthropologist and fellow professor at NYU Abu Dhabi, and they have one son. He is the elder brother of writer and Congo-focused humanitarian activist Jason Stearns.

== Selected publications ==
Books

- Infectious Ideas: Contagion in Premodern Islamic and Christian Thought in the Western Mediterranean. Baltimore: JHU Press. 2011. ISBN 978-0-8018-9873-0.
- al-Yusi, al-Hasan (2019). The Discourses: Reflections on History, Sufism, Theology, and Literature—Volume One. Edited and translated by Justin Stearns. NYU Press. ISBN 978-0-8147-6457-2.
- Revealed Sciences: The Natural Sciences in Islam in Seventeenth-Century Morocco. Cambridge University Press. 2021. ISBN 978-1-107-06557-4.

Articles

- Stearns, Justin K. (2014), "All Beneficial Knowledge is Revealed': The Rational Sciences in the Maghrib in the age of al-Yusi (d. 1102/1691)", Islamic Law and Society, 21: 49–80, doi:10.1163/15685195-02112p02.
- Stearns, Justin K. (2011), "Writing the History of the Natural Sciences in the pre-modern Muslim world: Historiography, Religion, and the Importance of the Early Modern Period", History Compass, 9 (12): 923–951, doi:10.1111/j.1478-0542.2011.00810.x, hdl:21.11116/0000-0006-E558-5.
- Stearns, Justin K. (2011), "The Frontier of Gottfried Liedl: Situating the origins of European modernity in Naṣrid Granada", Journal of Medieval Iberian Studies, 3 (2): 247–262, doi:10.1080/17546559.2011.610184, S2CID 159932236.
- Stearns, Justin K. (2009), "Representing and Remembering al-Andalus: Some Historical Considerations Regarding the End of Time and the Making of Nostalgia", Medieval Encounters, vol. 15, pp. 355–374, doi:10.1163/ej.9789004179196.i-276.51, ISBN 9789004179196.
- Stearns, Justin K. (2009), "New Directions in the Study of Religious Responses to the Black Death", History Compass, 7 (5): 1–13, doi:10.1111/j.1478-0542.2009.00634.x.

Encyclopedia Articles

- Entries for al-Hasan al-Yusi and Ibn al-Banna in Dictionary of African Biography (2011)
- Entry on “Contagion” for the Encyclopedia of Islam, 3rd edition (2010), 180–82.
