= Palace of Nine Perfections =

Imperial residence of the Tang dynasty

Coordinates: 34°40′45″N 107°47′08″E

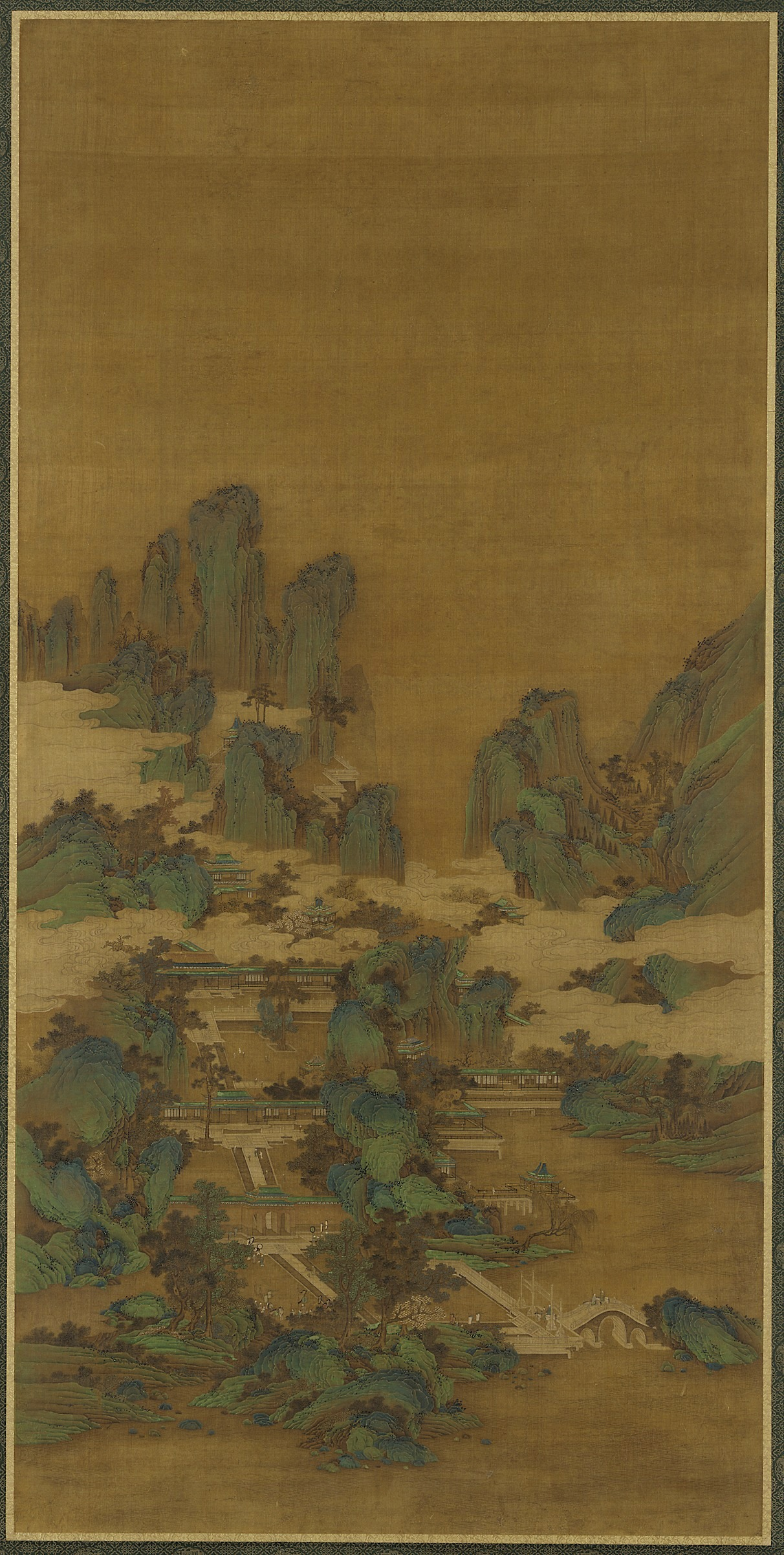
"Emperor Taizong Arriving at the Jiucheng Palace" – a Ming dynasty painting from around 1500 in the style of Li Sixun.

The Palace of Nine Perfections (Chinese: 九成宮; pinyin: Jiǔchéng Gōng) was a summer palace of the Chinese Tang dynasty, located in Linyou in the Qin Mountains north-west of the imperial capital Chang'an.

The palace was built for the Emperor Taizong of Tang as a renovation of the earlier Renshou Palace (仁壽宮) built for the Emperor Wen of Sui. The project was ordered in 631 and Emperor Taizong visited each year in the summer. In the summer of 632, he discovered a spring which was dug out and found to provide sweet water. A stele was erected to record this with an inscription composed by chancellor Wei Zheng and carved by the imperial calligrapher, Ouyang Xun. This is a famous example of his calligraphy and rubbings are now held by several museums. The palace is also the subject of paintings and music such as "The Palace of Nine Perfections" by Eric Ewazen.

== Gallery ==
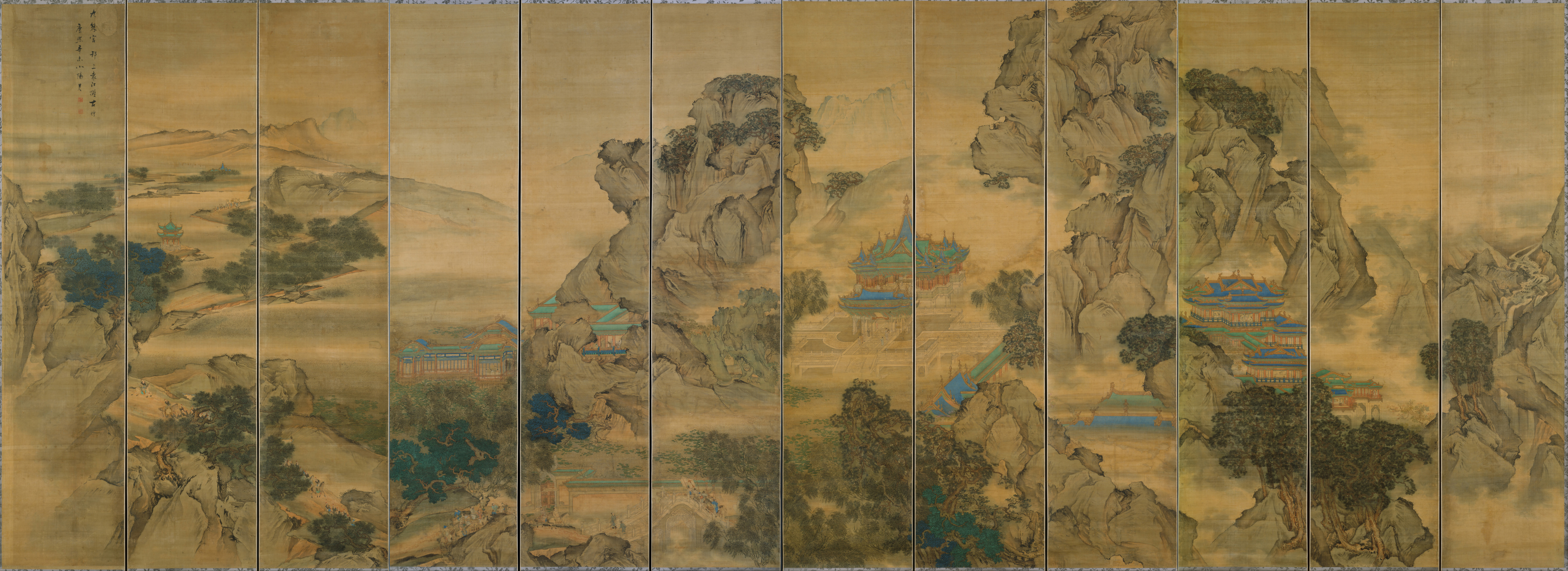
"The Palace of Nine Perfections" – a set of twelve scrolls on silk by Yuan Jiang. This was inked and painted in 1691 and so includes impressions of the contemporary Kangxi Emperor as well as an imagining of the long-lost palace.

== See also ==
- Palace of Perfection
