= Abu Jandal ibn Suhayl =

Companion of Muhammad

- أبو جندل إبن سهيل
- Born: Al-ʿĀṣī ibn Suhayl; Mecca, Hijaz, Arabia
- Died: 18 AH/639 CE; Imwas, As-Sham, Rashidun Caliphate (Modern-day Israel)
- Parents: Suhayl ibn Amr (father); Fakhita bint Amir ibn Nawfal (mother)
- Relatives: Abdullah ibn Suhayl (brother)
- Family: Banu Abd Shams (Quraish)

Al-ʿĀṣī ibn Suhayl (Arabic: العاصي ابن سهيل), better known as Abū Jandal (أبو جندل), was a companion of the Islamic prophet Muhammad, who was the first person returned to Mecca after the Treaty of Hudaybiyyah. Abu Jandal was also the brother of Abdullah ibn Suhayl and son of Suhayl ibn Amr, the orator of Quraysh.

== Biography ==
Abu Jandal was an early convert to Islam, following the lead of his brother Abdullah ibn Suhayl. Due to the position of their father Suhayl ibn Amr in the leadership of Quraysh, Abu Jandal and Abdullah were persecuted and hid their conversion. Abdullah converted to Islam and cleverly rode with the vanguard of Quraysh to Badr where he switched sides and joined Muhammad and battled against the pagans of Quraysh and his father the next day. When Suhayl learned that his second son was a Muslim, he had him beaten and locked at home. Abu Jandal remained in this state under close watch and harsh punishment for several years until the time of the Treaty of Hudabiyyah.

Hearing that Muhammad was near Mecca and coming, Abu Jandal, bound in chains escaped and ran to the camp of the Muslims at Hudaybiyyah. The Muslims were shocked to see his condition. According to the treaty, any Meccans who attempted to become Muslim and flee to Medina without the permission of his guardian(s) would be returned to Mecca. Upon seeing his son and understanding that he was attempting to flee to the security of Muhammad, Suhayl pointed at his son and informed them that he would be the first person returned to Quraysh. Abu Jandal exclaimed to the Muslim people that they would return him to the polytheists when he comes to them as a Muslim. Unfortunately, Muhammad had to return Abu Jandal but encouraged him to remain steadfast.

After some time, Abu Jandal and the other people who had been returned to Mecca thought that they would simply escape from Mecca and settle somewhere other than Medina. In doing this, they were able to escape their persecution and allow the treaty to stay intact and keep themselves from being returned to Mecca. Abu Jandal and others led by Abu Baseer gathered at a small town near the Jeddah coast called Ghufar, and their news spread to others wishing to escape Mecca as Muslims.

Eventually, this group of about 70 men with Abu Baseer and Abu Jandal formed a raiding party to ravage the Meccan trade caravans on their way to and from Syria. For almost a year, Quraysh was unable to get past Abu Jandal and his peers, crushing the Meccan economy. Quraysh then wrote to Muhammad in Medina asking him to please welcome the men at Ghufar into Medina and allow them to join him away from the Meccan caravans. Abu Baseer died soon after reading Muhammad's invitation to Medina, and Abu Jandal led the caravan of men and all of the wealth they had amassed to Medina. When they arrived at Medina, Abu Jandal greeted, and reunited with, his brother, Abdullah. For some time, Abu Jandal, Abdullah and every other companion of Muhammad remained in Medina. But some time later, Abdullah and Abu Jandal returned to their home in Mecca and successfully persuaded their father to meet Muhammad and convert to Islam.

Later, in 632, Abdullah went to and was martyred in the Battle of Al-Yamamah. Abu Jandal heard the news of his brother's martyrdom and informed his father of it. Both Abu Jandal and his father, Suhayl, mourned Abdullah, and decided to join the Muslim army. Thereafter, they fought in every, or almost every, subsequent battle, including the Battle of Al-Yarmuk.

== Death ==
Abu Jandal died in Emmaus Nicopolis, succumbing to the plague in 18 AH or 639 CE.

== See also ==
- List of Sahabah
