= Linyou County =

Coordinates: 34°48′01″N 107°42′32″E

Linyou County 麟游县 Linyu
- County
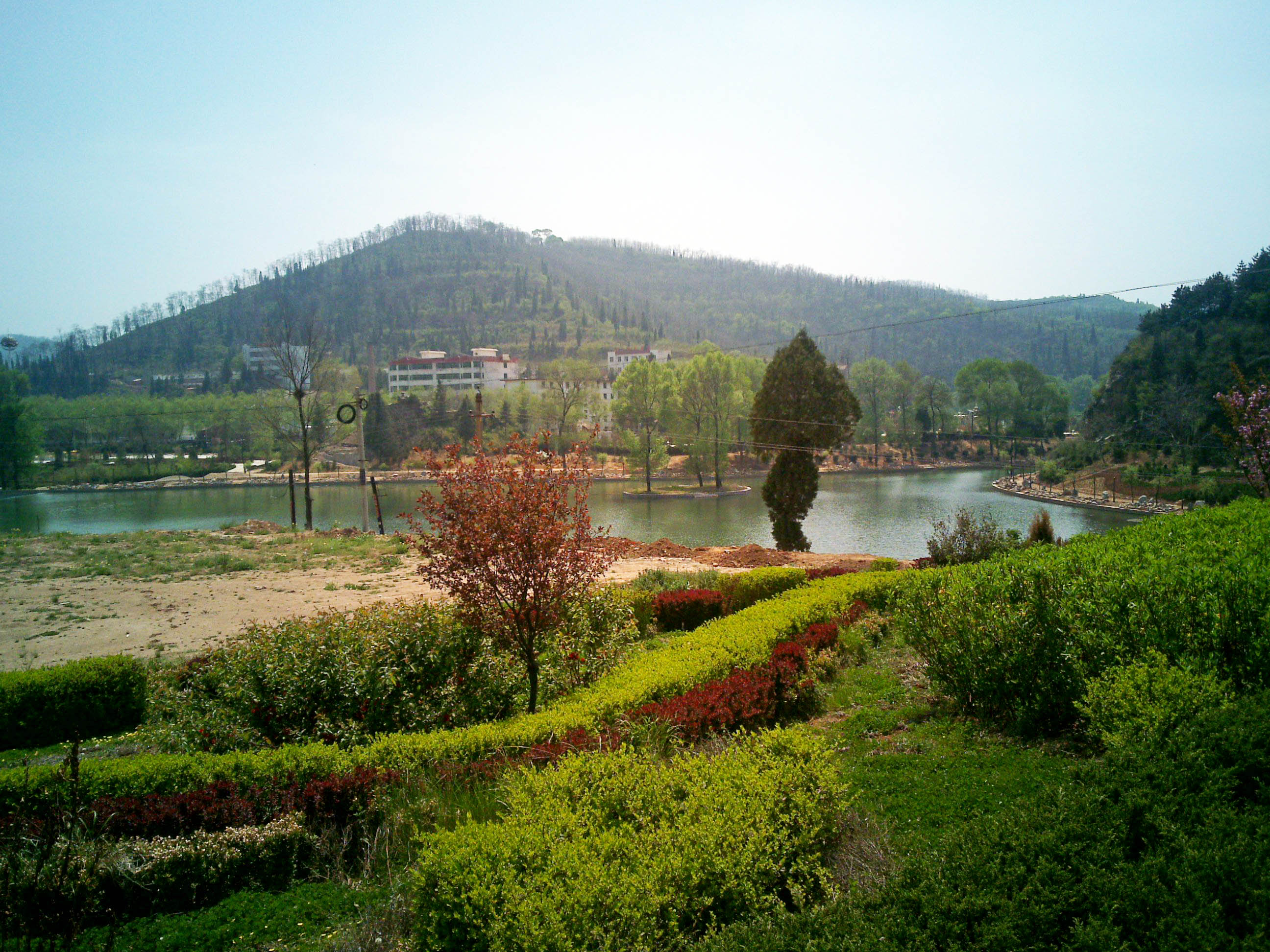
- Interactive map of Linyou County
- Country: People's Republic of China
- Province: Shaanxi
- Prefecture-level city: Baoji

Area
  - Total: 1,740 km^{2} (670 sq mi)
- Elevation: 1,271 m (4,170 ft)
- Highest elevation: 1,664 m (5,459 ft)
- Lowest elevation: 740 m (2,430 ft)

Population (2018)
  - Total: 92,100
  - Density: 52.9/km^{2} (137/sq mi)
- Time zone: UTC+8 (China standard time)
- Postal Code: 721500

Linyou County (simplified Chinese: 麟游县; traditional Chinese: 麟遊縣; pinyin: Línyóu Xiàn) is a county of Baoji, in the west of Shaanxi province, China, bordering Gansu province to the north and northwest. Linyou was first established over 2,200 years ago as Duyang County (杜阳县). Located in the scenic Qinling mountains, just 160 km (99 mi) from Xi'an and 110 km (68 mi) from Baoji, it was a popular place for poets, painters and nobility to enjoy the landscape. The Sui dynasty Renshou Palace and Tang dynasty Jiucheng Palace were built in Linyou, of which archeological remains have been excavated. They were described by the famous poet Du Fu.

Nowadays Linyou is known for being the 'home of Boer goats' in China and for its walnut honey.

== Administrative divisions ==
As of 2020, Linyou County is divided to 7 towns.

Towns

- Jiuchenggong (九成宫镇)
- Cuimu (崔木镇)
- Zhaoxian (招贤镇)
- Liangting (两亭镇)
- Changfeng (常丰镇)
- Zhangba (丈八镇)
- Jiufang (酒房镇)

== Climate ==
Climate data for Linyou, elevation 1,026 m (3,366 ft), (1991–2020 normals, extremes 1981–2010)
Month	Jan	Feb	Mar	Apr	May	Jun	Jul	Aug	Sep	Oct	Nov	Dec	Year
Record high °C (°F)	18.4 (65.1)	22.5 (72.5)	28.0 (82.4)	34.8 (94.6)	34.6 (94.3)	37.8 (100.0)	37.8 (100.0)	35.4 (95.7)	35.9 (96.6)	29.6 (85.3)	25.7 (78.3)	20.1 (68.2)	37.8 (100.0)
Mean daily maximum °C (°F)	4.2 (39.6)	7.5 (45.5)	13.3 (55.9)	19.8 (67.6)	24.0 (75.2)	27.8 (82.0)	29.1 (84.4)	27.2 (81.0)	22.2 (72.0)	16.9 (62.4)	11.3 (52.3)	5.8 (42.4)	17.4 (63.4)
Daily mean °C (°F)	−4.0 (24.8)	−0.4 (31.3)	5.2 (41.4)	11.4 (52.5)	15.8 (60.4)	20.0 (68.0)	22.3 (72.1)	20.8 (69.4)	15.9 (60.6)	9.8 (49.6)	3.4 (38.1)	−2.3 (27.9)	9.8 (49.7)
Mean daily minimum °C (°F)	−9.4 (15.1)	−5.7 (21.7)	−0.6 (30.9)	4.6 (40.3)	9.0 (48.2)	13.5 (56.3)	16.9 (62.4)	16.3 (61.3)	11.7 (53.1)	5.2 (41.4)	−1.7 (28.9)	−7.5 (18.5)	4.4 (39.8)
Record low °C (°F)	−20.4 (−4.7)	−18.3 (−0.9)	−13.4 (7.9)	−7.2 (19.0)	−1.4 (29.5)	4.6 (40.3)	7.6 (45.7)	6.8 (44.2)	0.0 (32.0)	−8.7 (16.3)	−17.0 (1.4)	−25.2 (−13.4)	−25.2 (−13.4)
Average precipitation mm (inches)	7.7 (0.30)	9.9 (0.39)	24.3 (0.96)	34.7 (1.37)	54.1 (2.13)	71.6 (2.82)	111.0 (4.37)	113.9 (4.48)	101.4 (3.99)	54.5 (2.15)	19.0 (0.75)	5.2 (0.20)	607.3 (23.91)
Average precipitation days (≥ 0.1 mm)	4.8	5.4	7.3	7.5	10.4	10.3	11.6	12.5	12.5	11.3	6.1	3.6	103.3
Average snowy days	5.7	5.3	3.7	0.3	0	0	0	0	0	0.3	2.7	4.0	22
Average relative humidity (%)	63	63	63	64	68	71	77	81	83	79	71	64	71
Mean monthly sunshine hours	162.5	146.6	176.5	197.2	208.5	208.3	203.5	178.8	135.7	143.4	159.6	166.9	2,087.5
Percentage possible sunshine	52	47	47	50	48	48	46	44	37	41	52	55	47
Source: China Meteorological Administration

== See also ==
- Ashina Jiesheshuai § Jiucheng Palace raid
- Emperor Wen of Sui, who commissioned the Renshou Palace
