= Kürşat (hero) =

Fictional hero based on Göktürk prince Ashina Jiesheshuai

Kürşat or Kürşad is a Turkish male name based on a historical character. He is the idealized character of a real person whose name was given as Ashina Jiesheshuai in the 7th-century Chinese chronicles.

== Jiesheshuai event ==
Eastern Turkic Khaganate collapsed in 630 and most of Turkic tribal leaders accepted the suzerainty of Tang China. Tang emperor Taizong tried to subjugate the Turkic tribes by offering posts to Turkic princes. Jiesheshuai of the Ashina house, was appointed as a general. However, in 639, he staged a coup to arrest the emperor. He was planning to get the freedom of Turks and to enthrone Holohu, his nephew as the khagan of Turks. However he couldn't succeed and was executed. Although the plot was unsuccessful, Taizong worried about the closeness of the Turkic tribes which were settled in the area south of Yellow River and changed the policy of Turkic settlement.

== Kürşat in literature ==
In Old Turkic, Kür means "strong" and "victor". Şad 'sons of khan' was the title of a clan leader of the royal blood. Şad's were assistants of the khagan (emperor) or yabgu (ruler of the west portion of the empire). Thus Kür-şat (or Kür-şad) was a compound name. It was popularized by Turkish author Nihal Atsız. Atsız told about the Jiesheshuai event and the name Kürşat to his colleague (later opponent) Sabahattin Ali who in 1936 wrote a play named Esirler (Captives) based on Jiesheshuai. But it was not an epic play and Kürşat was portrayed as a desperate lover. Nihal Atsız criticized the play and decided to use the name in one of his novels.

Kürşat was mentioned in his 1946 epic novel named Bozkurtların Ölümü (The death of Grey Wolves). In Turkic mythology The wolf symbolizes honor and is also considered the mother of most Turkic peoples In the novel, the death of the grey wolves refers to the collapse of Eastern Turkic khaganate. The first section of the novel refers to 621 events when Turks were independent. Second section is about the collapse of the khaganate and the last section is about the Jiesheshuai event. The main difference from the historic event is that the author Nihal Atsız has named the hero Kürşat instead of Jiesheshuai. The name was further popularized when Niyazi Yıldırım Gençosmanoğlu wrote a poem based on the novel. In a second novel, Atsız mentioned Kürşat's son.

== Modern name Kürşat ==
Jiesheshuai was a Chinese transliteration, and therefore the original Turkic name was uncertain. But the story was popularized under the name of Kürşat and beginning by 1946, Kürşat is used as a male name in Turkey. According to a survey, the use of modern name Kürşat ranks 396th in male names in Turkey which corresponds to 1 out of 1841.
