= Shoroon Bumbagar tomb =

Ancient tomb in Töv Province, Mongolia

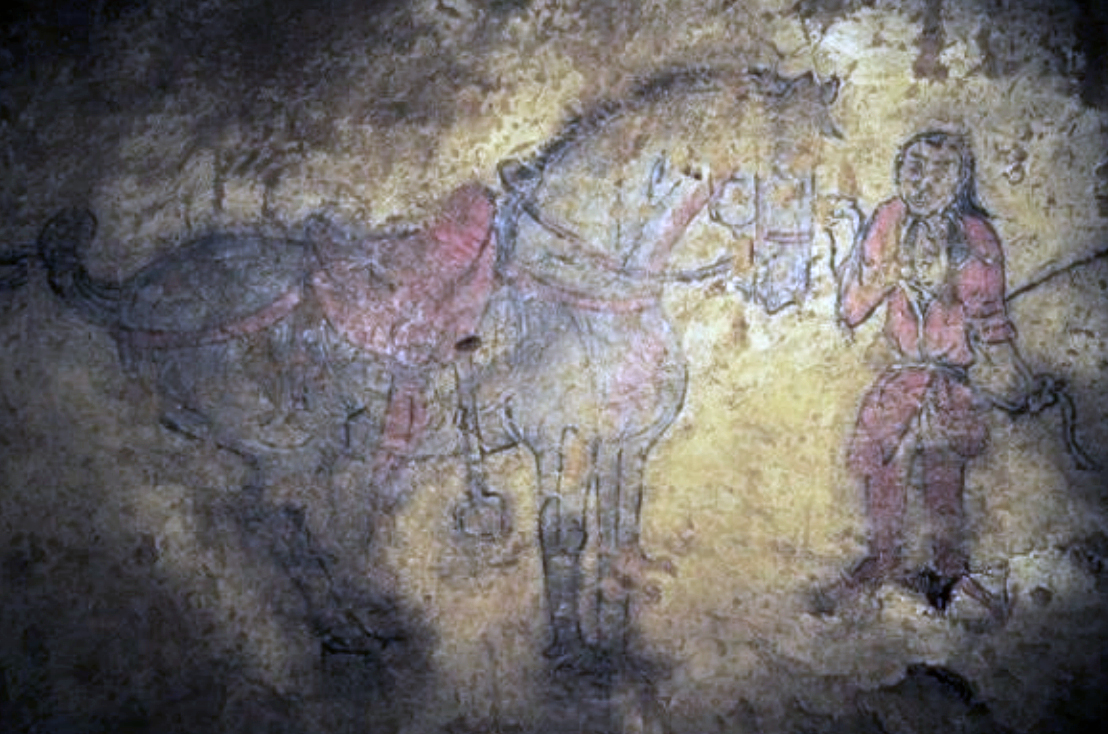
- Shoroon Bumbagar tomb mural, Göktürk, 7th century CE, Mongolia.

- Location within Mongolia Location within Asia
- 47°57′18″N 104°32′20″E
- Type: Tomb
- Location: Mongolia

History
- Built: c. 650–700

The Shoroon Bumbagar tomb is an ancient tomb in Zaamar, Töv Province, 160 km (99 mi) west of Ulaanbaatar, Mongolia about 2.5 km (1.6 mi) north-east from the banks of the Tuul River and close to the 10th-century Khitan town of Khermen Denzh on the banks of the Tuul River. It was built for a Turkic nobleman, believed to be a high ranking yabghu (governor) or a tegin (prince) between 650 and 700.

== Description ==
The tomb was discovered and excavated in 2011. It is a massive buried structure, which is 42 m (138 ft) long, 1.8 m (5.9 ft) wide and 7.5 m (25 ft) deep. The structure is characteristic of Northern Wei, Sui dynasty and Tang dynasty tombs, but not of contemporary Göktürk tombs, which tend to be shallow and circular, forming a small elevated mound covered with rocks. The tomb of Shoroon Bumbagar was never looted and therefore was found to hold far more artifacts including an intact door, many statues and wall paintings of people, dragons and temples, although there was no inscription. 117 clay objects were discovered. About 50 Byzantine gold coins were also found in the tomb, which had been used as ornaments.

The tomb is an example of a Chinese-style Turkic memorial complex, dated to the second half of the 7th century, with Chinese architectural influence due to Tang control of the area at the time. Chinese culture and military power had been dominant over the Turks, since the Turkic defeat under Illig Qaghan in the War of Yin-shan (630), marking the end of the Eastern Turkic Khaganate.

The Shoroon Bumbagar tomb is near and contemporary to the tomb of Pugu Yitu, a Turkic chief who was also a vassal of the Tang dynasty under the Jimi system, and died in 678.

== Gallery ==
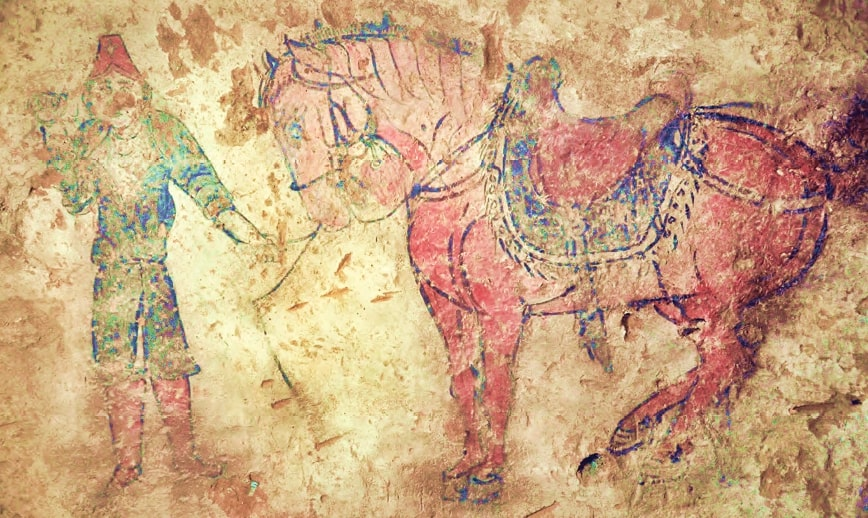
Shoroon Bumbagar tomb mural, Göktürk, 7th century, Mongolia.

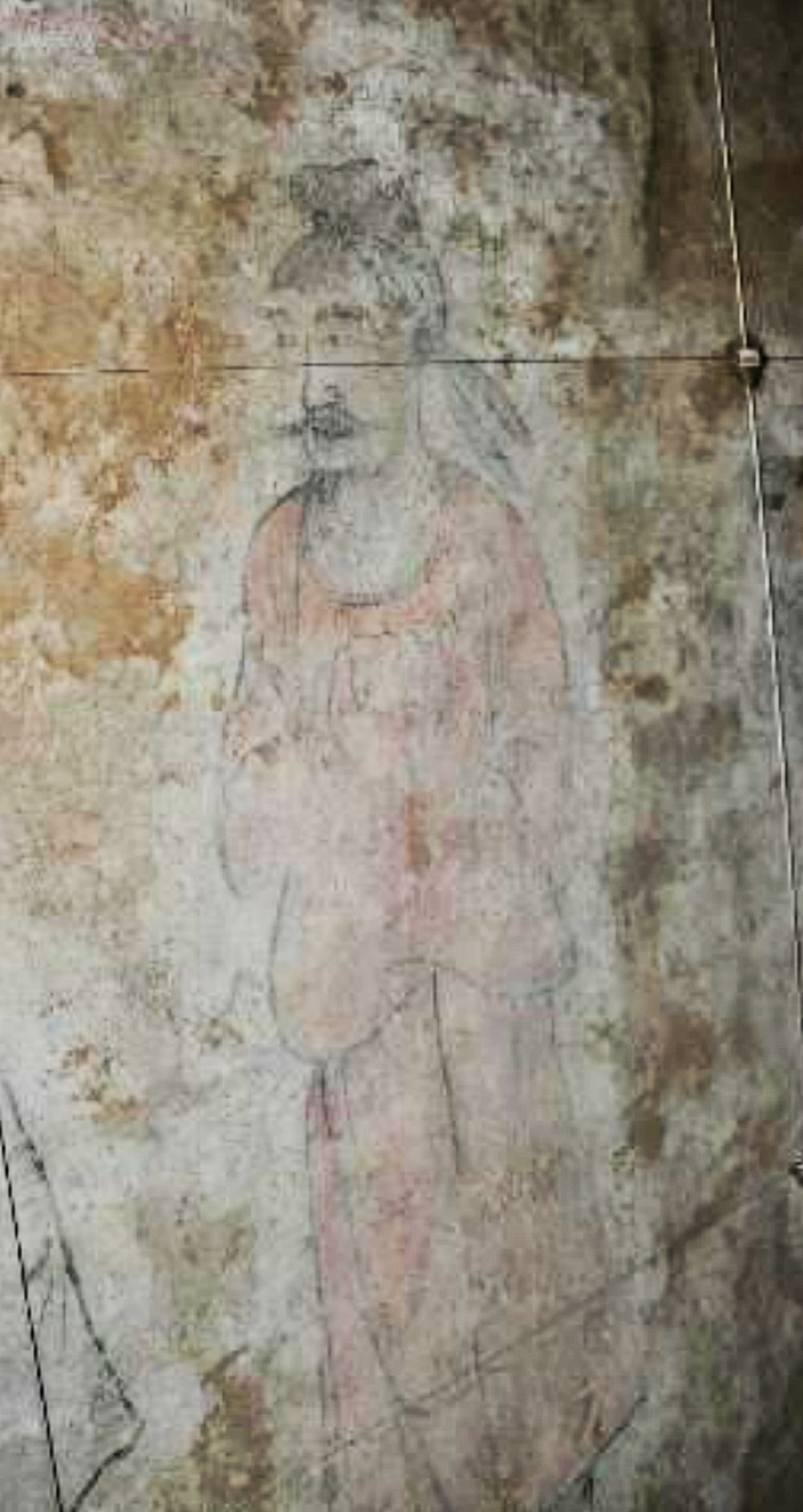
Mural from the dromos of Shoroon Bumbagar, attendants in Chinese costume.

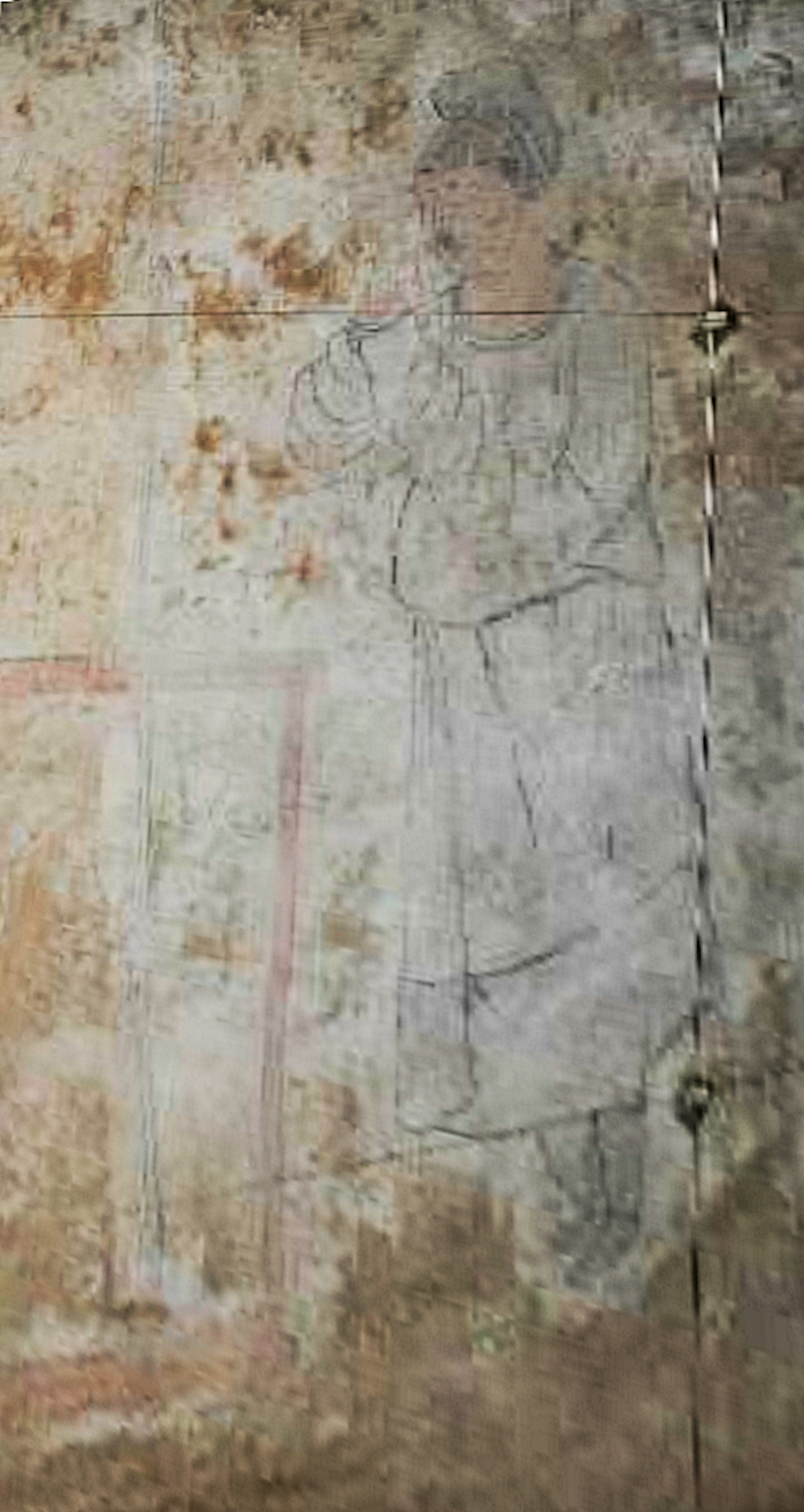
Mural from the dromos of Shoroon Bumbagar, attendants in Chinese costume.

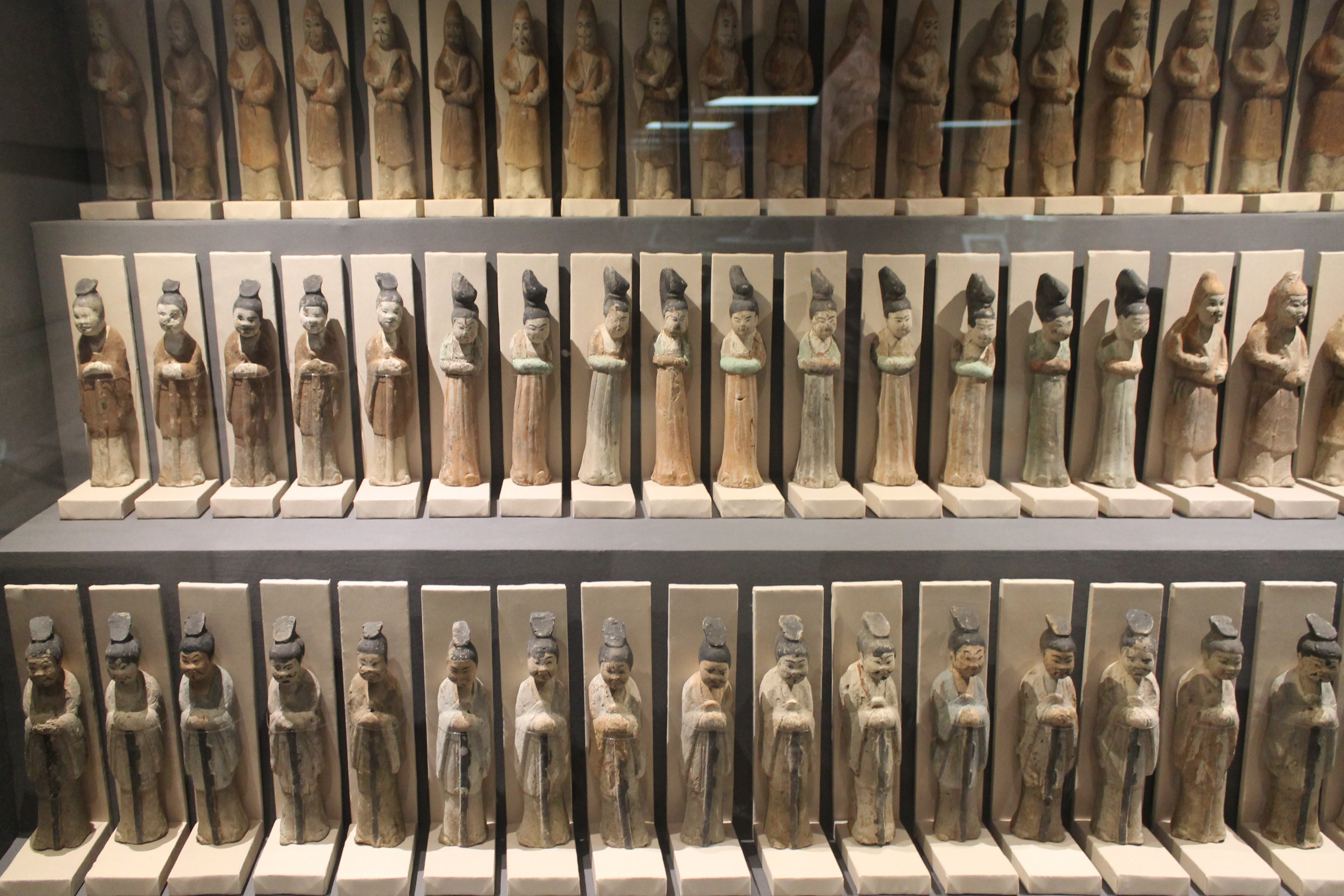
Tang-style statuettes from the tomb. Kharakhorum Museum.

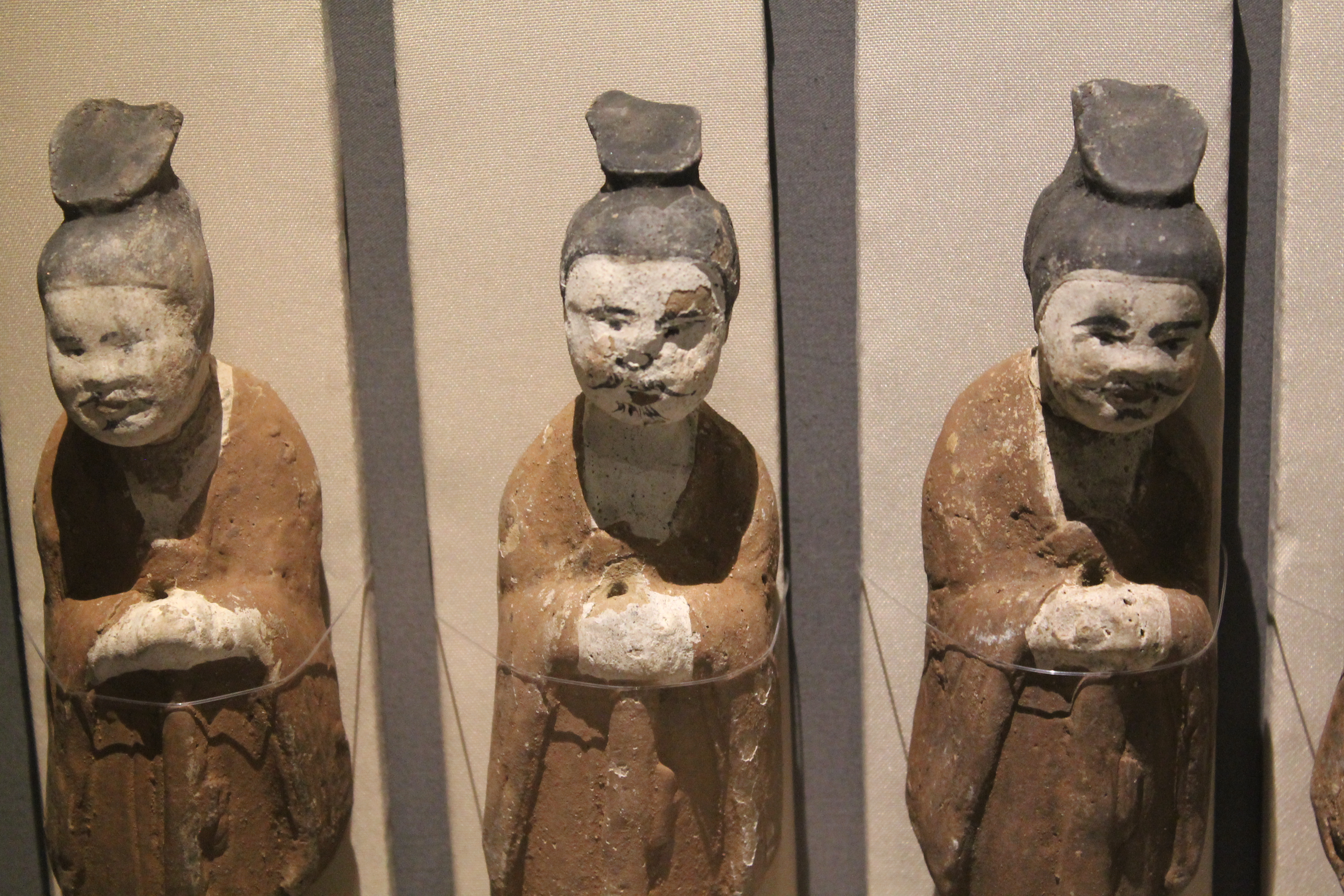
Tang-style statuettes from the tomb. Kharakhorum Museum.

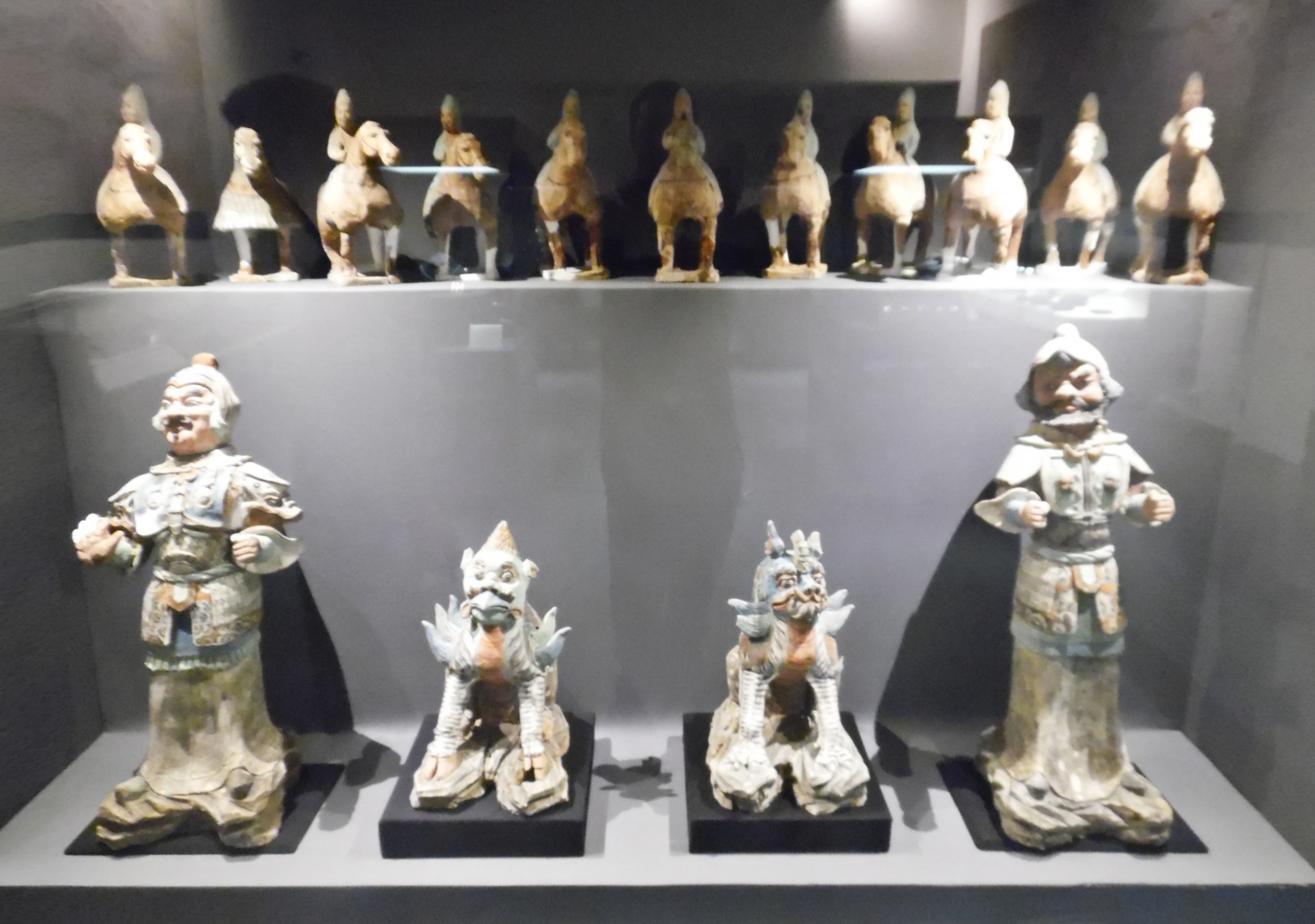
Shoroon Bumbagar terracotta statuettes.

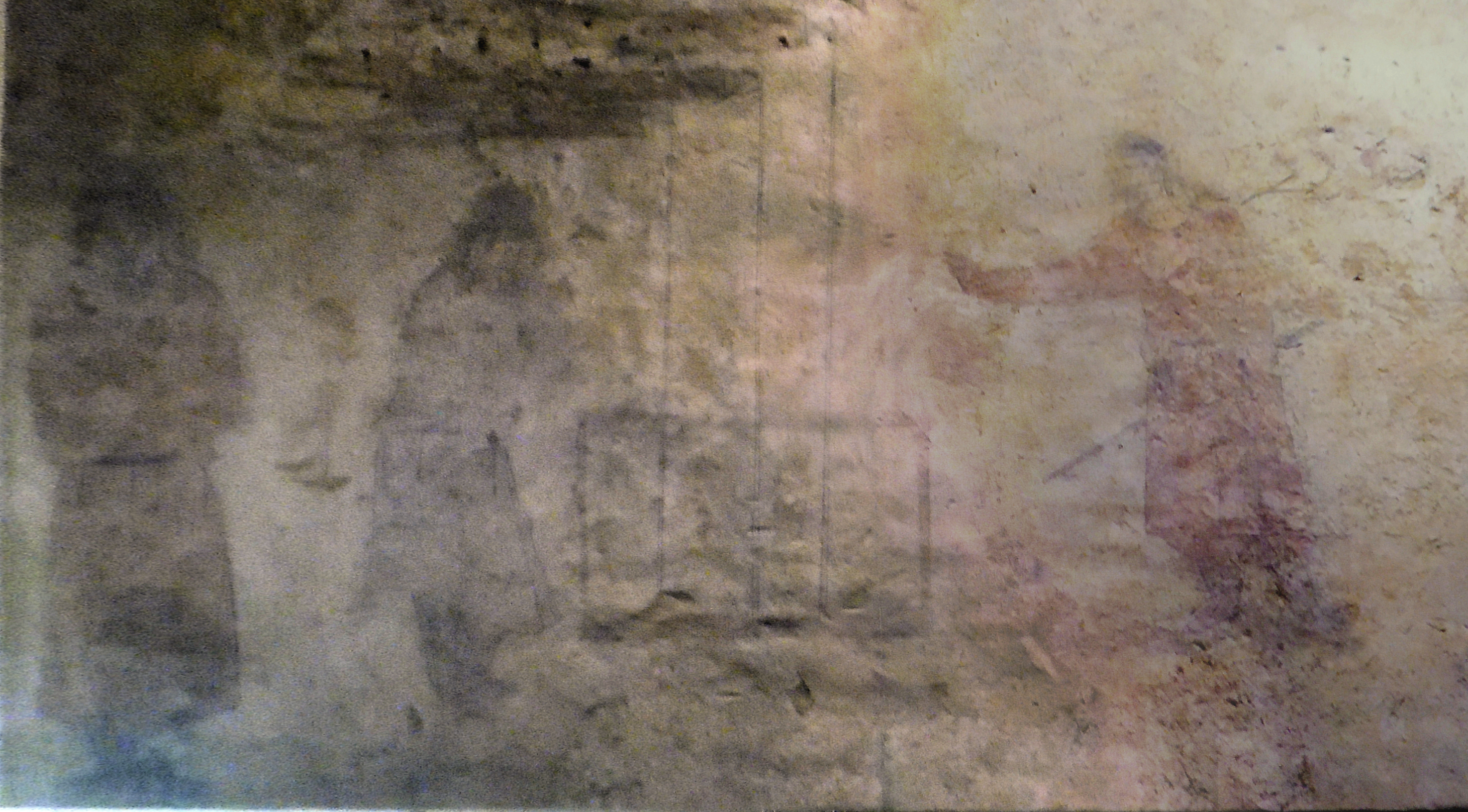
Shoroon Bumbagar mural Karakorum Museum (detail).

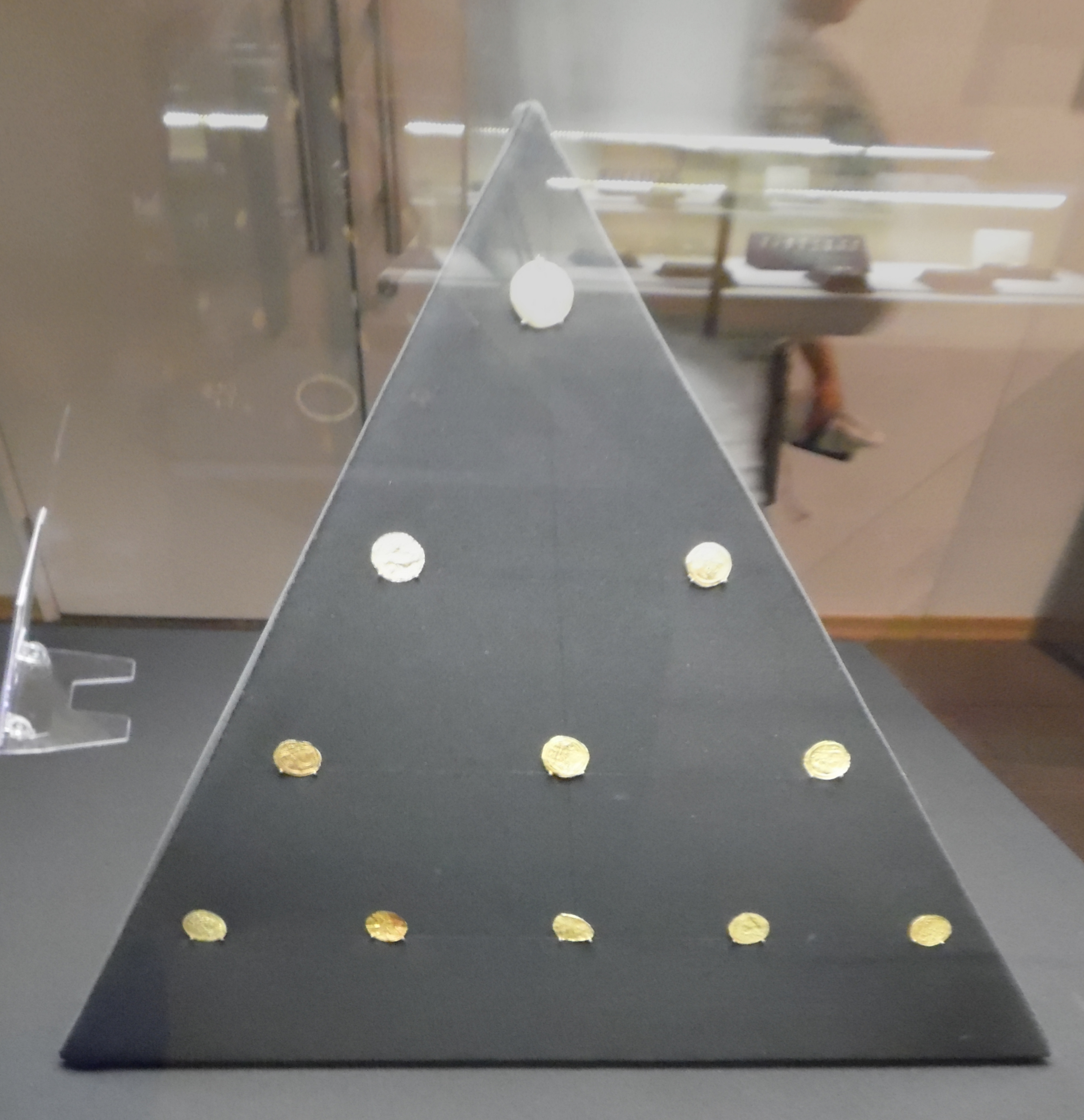
Shoroon Bumbagar Byzantine Empire coins, Karakorum Museum.
