= Yuanfeng Jiuyu Zhi =

1085 Chinese geographical treatise

The Yuanfeng Jiuyu Zhi (元豐九域志; "The Yuanfeng Treatise of the Nine Regions") is a 1085 Chinese geographical treatise written by Song dynasty scholars Wang Cun (王存), Zeng Zhao (曾肇) and Li Dechu (李德芻). "Yuanfeng" is an era name corresponding to the years 1078-1085 during Emperor Shenzong of Song's reign. Containing 10 chapters, it is the most detailed geographic description of every region of the Song empire. Included are descriptions of the four capitals, the 23 administrative circuits, and administration units beyond imperial territory (such as Jimi prefectures). Below the circuit level each prefecture (such as zhou and fu) is described, as well as the geographical circumstances, household numbers, the main local products, the historical development of the location, and garrisons.
