= Tomb of Pugu Yitu =

Epitaph of Pugu Yitu
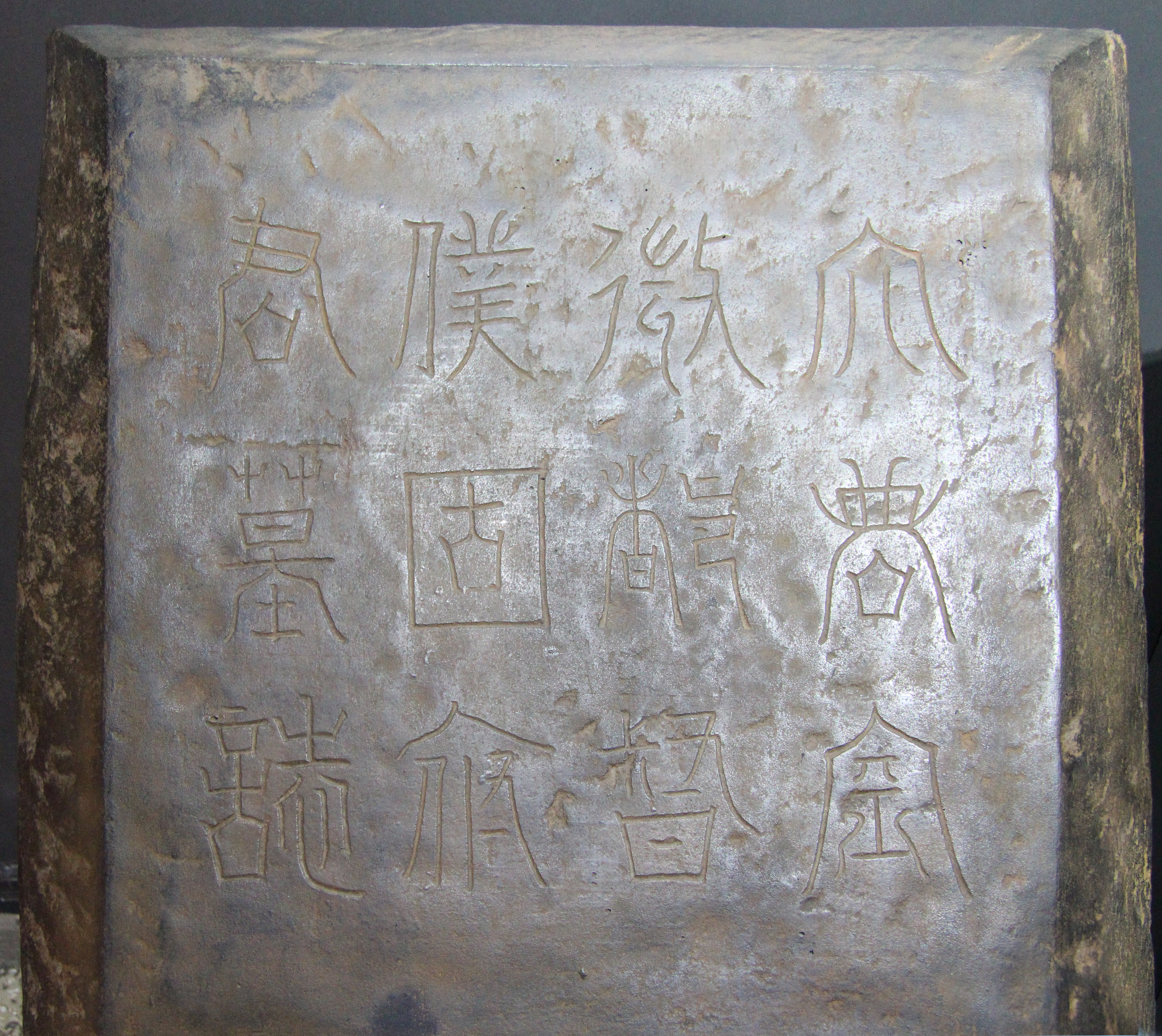
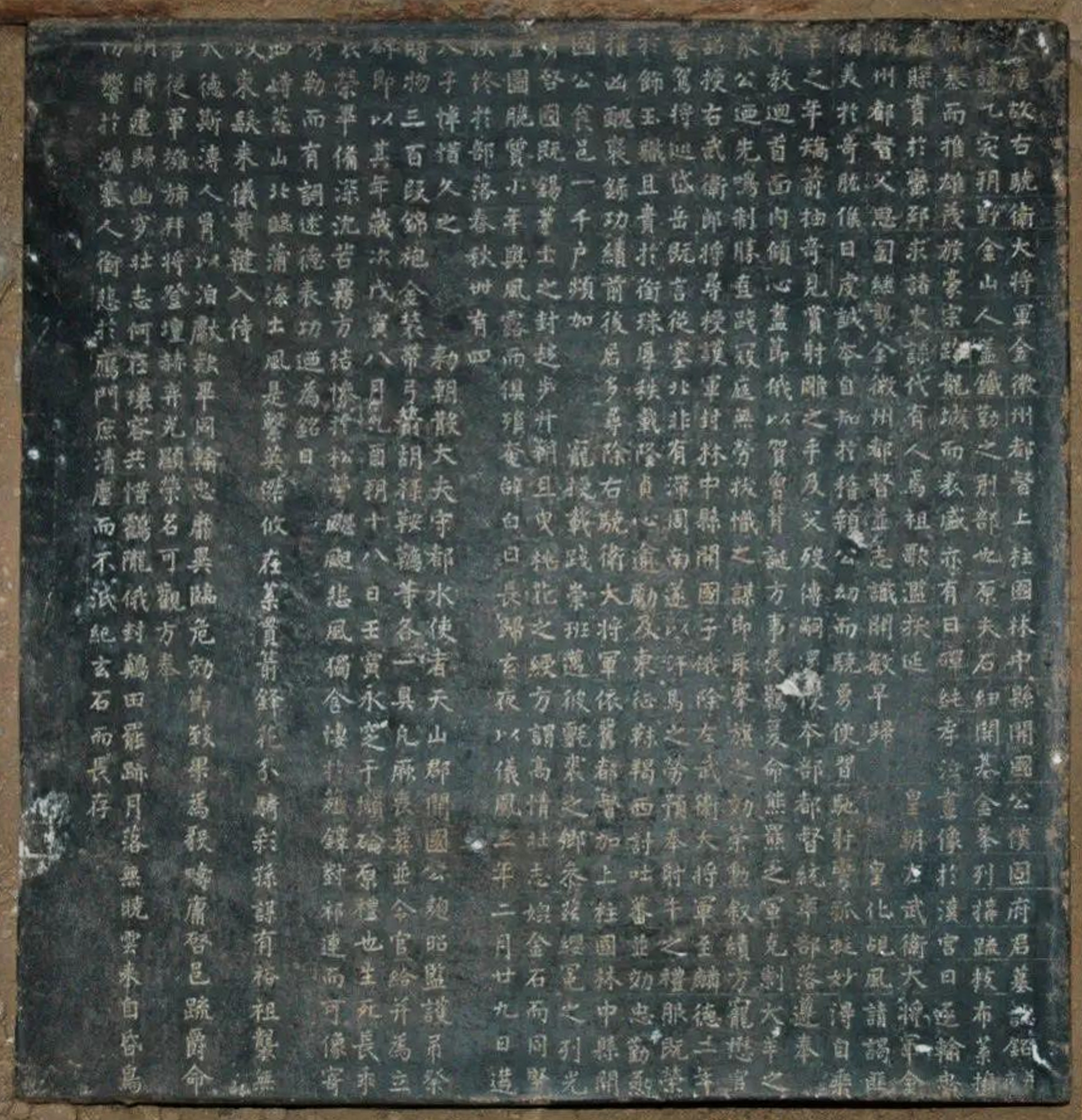
- Epitaph cover of Pugu Yitu. Epitaph of Pugu Yitu. Location of the Shoroon Dov Kurgan, where the tomb of Pugu Yitu and his epitaph were discovered.

- Location within Mongolia Location within Asia
- 48.001073°N 104.714778°E
- Type: Tomb
- Location: Mongolia

The tomb of Pugu Yitu (Chinese: 仆固乙突), also known as the Shoroon Dov Kurgan, is a Tang dynasty-style Turkic burial structure dating to 678. It was excavated in 2009 by a joint Russian-Mongolian team in Zaamar District, Töv Province, 160 km (99 mi) west of Ulaanbaatar, Mongolia about 2.5 km (1.6 mi) north-east of the banks of the Tuul River and close to the 10th-century Khitan town of Khermen Denzh on the banks of the Tuul River.

The tomb has been robbed but still contains an epitaph inscription in Classical Chinese that describes Pugu Yitu's career as a Tang-appointed ruler of the Pugu tribe in the Tiele Confederation. Pugu Yitu was given the title of Dudu (都督) or Commander-in-Chief of the Jinweizhou (金微州) protectorate under the Tang's Jimi system. The nearby tomb of Shoroon Bumbagar was never looted and therefore was found to hold far more artifacts including an intact door, many statues and wall paintings of people, dragons and temples, although there is no inscription. The tomb of Pugu Yitu is unusual in that it has an inscription. Apart from the cover inscription of Pugu Yitu measuring 75 by 75 cm (30 by 30 in) with 4 lines of 3 characters each, the main inscription has 28 lines with 31 characters each.

== Tomb ==
=== Excavation ===
Two Tang dynasty-style tombs were excavated in central Mongolia in 2009 and 2011. Each tomb was marked by a large pounded-earth tumulus that the Mongolian herders called shoroon bumbagar, or "dirt ball". One of the tombs contains a Chinese language epitaph in the Tang-style stating that the tomb belongs to Pugu Yitu, the leader of the Pugu tribe of the Tiele Confederation. It is located in Zaamar District of Töv Province in Mongolia. The second tomb is located 11 kilometres (6.8 mi) away in Bayannuur, Bulgan. The naming of the two tombs is inconsistent and the second tomb has been called the Shoroon Bumbagar tomb as well as the Bayannuur tomb while the tomb of Pugu Yitu has been called the Shoroon Dov tomb. Both tombs are located about 200 kilometres (120 mi) west of the modern capital of Mongolia, Ulaanbaatar, and 150 kilometres (93 mi) northeast of the Orkhon River valley, which served as the center of power for both the Second Turkic Khaganate and the Uyghur Khaganate.

=== Design ===
Above the tomb chamber is a "dirt ball" five to six metres (twenty feet) tall. The walled enclosure measures 87 by 108 metres (285 by 354 ft). The tomb's construction displays the typical Tang shaft-tunnel method. The entrance faces the southwest and the total length from the entrance to the rear of the burial chamber measures 30 metres (98 ft) in length. The tunnel is sloped and contains three airshafts with a pair of facing niches under the second shaft. The shafts and ramp were backfilled after the burial. The epitaph stone and cover were placed at the end of the ramp on the floor of the antechamber. The antechamber and the dome chamber were separated by a brick sealing door that was broken by tomb robbers. The chamber is nearly square shaped about 4.25 metres (13.9 ft) long and across. The only major difference between Pugu Yitu's tomb and an elite Tang tomb is the lack of a coffin platform. Remains of a coffin or coffins were left on the floor by the robbers.

Despite lacking an epitaph, the second tomb and Pugu Yitu's tomb contain significant similarities such as their designs, figurines, and chemical composition, leading to theories that the second tomb is also the burial place of a Tiele tribal leader under Tang vassalage. Unlike Pugu Yitu's tomb, the second one has a larger perimeter. The park is larger with a rectangular earthen wall about 180 by 200 metres (590 by 660 ft) and a "dirt ball" 4.2 metres (14 ft) tall. It contains painted murals in the Tang style while Pugu Yitu's tomb does not. It is likely that other Tang-style tombs were constructed nearby due to the discovery of a fragment of a Chinese stele and more "dirt ball" structures that distinguish them from typical Turkic burials.

According to Anıl Yılmaz, the design of the two tombs is unlike traditional Turkic tombs while similar tombs can be found in China dating to the Wei, Sui, and Tang dynasties. The two tombs are situated along the north-south axis like in China and the cremated remains of the deceased are placed in a wooden box positioned on the western side of the chamber room. The Shoroon Bumbagar tomb's wall murals depict Chinese culture following the same tradition as the Han dynasty and are nearly identical to the ones in the Tang dynasty. Yılmaz argues that the second tomb appears more Chinese and may have been the burial place of a Chinese person, possibly a princess who had been married to a Turkic ruler. According to the accompanying epitaph, the Tang government paid for the funerary expenses and assigned Qu Zhao as part of the condolence delegation, which might explain the Chinese designs of the two tombs.

=== Artifacts ===
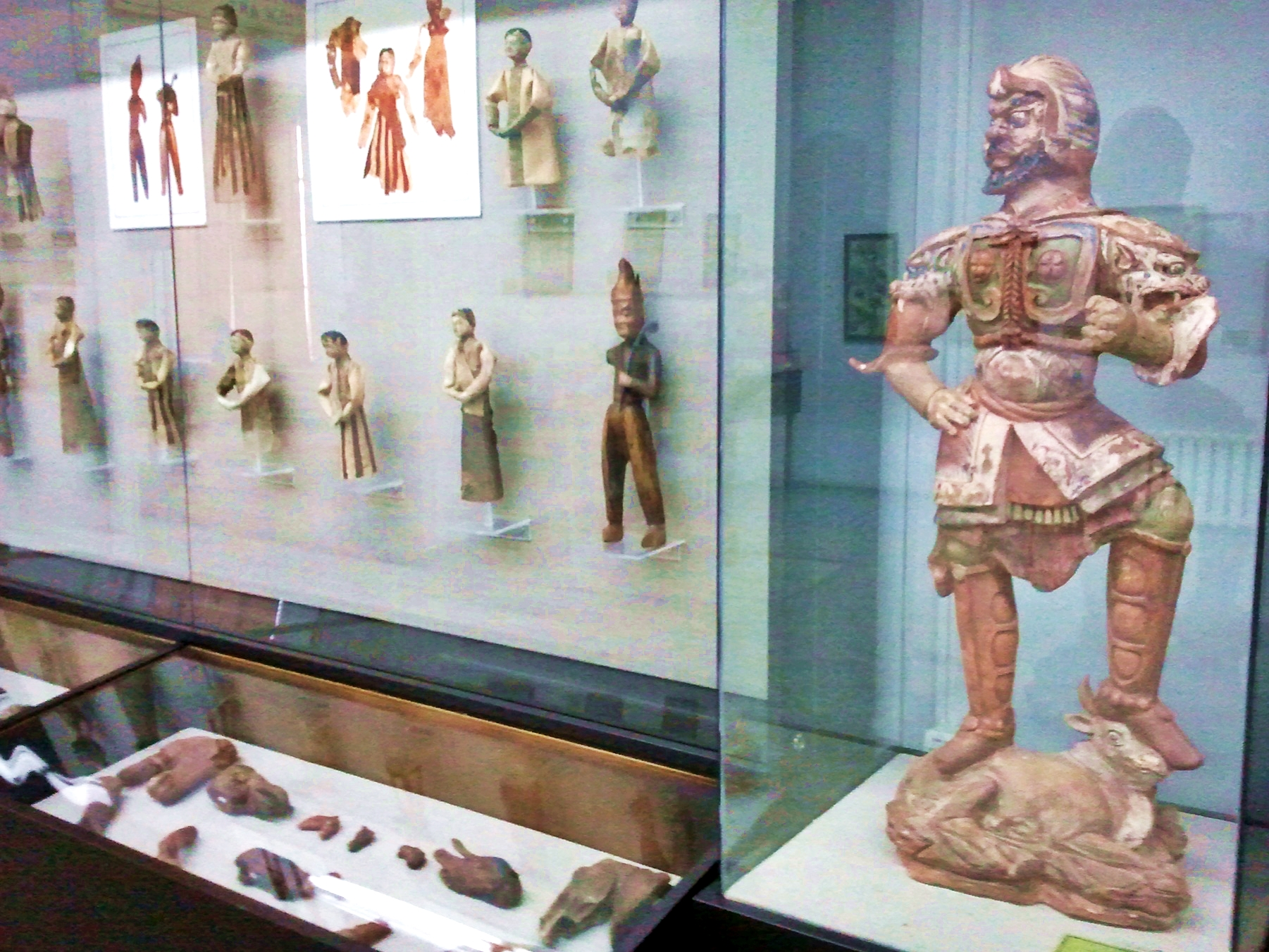
A heavenly king statue and figurines from the tomb of Pugu Yitu

Aside from the epitaph, the tomb contained at least 75 terracotta figurines and remains of over 40 wooden ones, all of which were painted. The painted wooden figurines of humans, animals, and mythical beasts were preserved due to the arid climate. There were 54 standing honor guards and 16 horsemen made of clay. In the tomb chamber there were three standing terracotta guardian kings and two squatting guardian beasts. All the terracotta figurines are in the same style as objects found in Chang'an and the artisans were likely trained there.

== Epitaph ==
=== Context ===
The epitaph is the earliest securely dated text discovered in Mongolia and contains information on diplomatic and military relations between the Tang and Turkic leaders in Mongolia from the 640s through the late 670s. During this period, the Tang vassalized the Pugu and other Tiele tribes, although both gained advantages from this relationship. The Tiele cavalry forces aided the Tang in their military campaigns while the Tiele were given gifts and Tang military support against their nomadic enemies.

The inscription was laid flat on the ground in front of the brick-faced main chamber where a number of painted statuettes were found. It reflects the perspective of the Tang state and details the service which Pugu Yitu, his father, and his grandfather rendered to the Tang. There is little information about local history and no signs that the Pugu contributed to its contents. The epitaph was likely created by a Tang official based on Pugu Yitu's record at the Ministry of Personnel (libu). This is seen in the style of the epitaph, its straightforward references to the Confucian classics and official Chinese histories, and stereotypical depiction of the Pugu as northern natives who were loyal to the Tang.

The craftsmanship of the epitaph as well as the Chinese inscription at Bilge Qaghan's memorial is noticeably inferior to the examples found at the Tang capital. The subpar workmanship likely points to difficulty in finding skilled artisans to travel to Mongolia and the epitaph was probably too heavy to transport from China and had to be made locally. In contrast, the calligraphy of the Kul Tigin stele is relatively good.

=== Inscription ===
The cover inscription has the following text:

大唐金/微都督/仆固府/君墓志 (Memorial inscription of the Gentlemanly Lord of Pugu Prefecture of Jinweizhou of the Great Tang)

The main inscription has the following text:

大唐故右驍衛大將軍金微州都督上柱國林中縣開國公仆固府君墓志銘並序 / 公諱乙突，朔野金山人，蓋鐵勤之別部也。原夫石紐開基，金峰列構，疏枝布葉，擁 / □塞而推雄，茂族豪宗，跨龍城而表盛。亦有日磾純孝，泣畫像於漢宮，日逐輸忠， / 委□□於鑾邳。求諸史諜，代有人焉。祖歌濫拔延，皇朝左武衛大將軍、金 / 微州都督。父思匐，繼襲金微州都督。並志識開敏，早歸皇化，覘風請謁，匪 / 獨美於奇肱，候日虔誠，本自知於稽顙。公幼而驍勇，便習馳射，彎弧挺妙，得自乘 / 羊之年，矯箭抽奇，見賞射雕之手。及父歿傳嗣，遂授本部都督，統率部落，遵奉 / 聲教。回首面內，傾心盡節。俄以賀魯背誕，方事長羈，爰命熊羆之軍，克剿犬羊之 / 眾。公乃先鳴制勝，直踐寇庭，無勞拔幟之謀，即取搴旗之效。策勛敘績，方寵懋官， / 詔授右武衛郎將，尋授護軍，封林中縣開國子，俄除左武衛大將軍。至麟德二年，/鑾駕將巡岱岳，既言從塞北，非有滯周南，遂以汗馬之勞，預奉射牛之禮。服既榮 / 於飾玉，職且貴於銜珠，厚秩載隆，貞心逾勵。及東征靺鞨，西討吐蕃，並效忠勤，亟 / 摧凶丑。裒錄功績，前后居多，尋除右驍衛大將軍，依舊都督，加上柱國，林中縣開 / 國公，食邑一千戶。頻加寵授，載踐崇班，邁彼氈裘之鄉，參茲纓冕之列。光 / 膺啟國，既錫茅土之封，趨步升朝，且曳桃花之綬。方謂高情壯志，媲金石而同堅，/ 豈圖脆質小年，與風露而俱殞。奄辭白日，長歸玄夜。以儀鳳三年二月廿九日遘 / 疾，終於部落。春秋卌有四。/ 天子悼惜久之，敕朝散大夫、守都水使者天山郡開國公麴昭，監護吊祭， / 賻物三百段，錦袍金裝帶弓箭胡祿鞍韉等各一具。凡厥喪葬，並令官給，並為立 / 碑。即以其年歲次戊寅八月乙酉朔十八日壬寅，永窆於纈碖原，禮也。生死長乖，/ 哀榮畢備，深沉苦霧，方結慘於鬆塋，飋[風+日]悲風，獨含淒於薤鐸。對祁連而可像，寄□勒而有詞，述德表功，乃為銘曰：/西歭蔥山，北臨蒲海，土風是系，英杰攸在。葉貫箭鋒，花分騎彩，孫謀有裕，祖襲無 / 改。束發來儀，腰鞬入侍，/ 天德斯溥，人胥以洎。獻款畢同，輸忠靡異，臨危效節，致果為毅。疇庸啟邑，疏爵命 / 官，從軍擁旆，拜將登壇。赫弈光顯，榮名可觀，方奉 / 明時，遽歸幽穸。壯志何在，瓌容共惜，鶴隴俄封，雞田罷跡。月落無曉，雲來自昏，鳥 / 切響於鴻塞，人銜悲於雁門，庶清塵而不泯，紀玄石而長存。

== Pugu Yitu ==
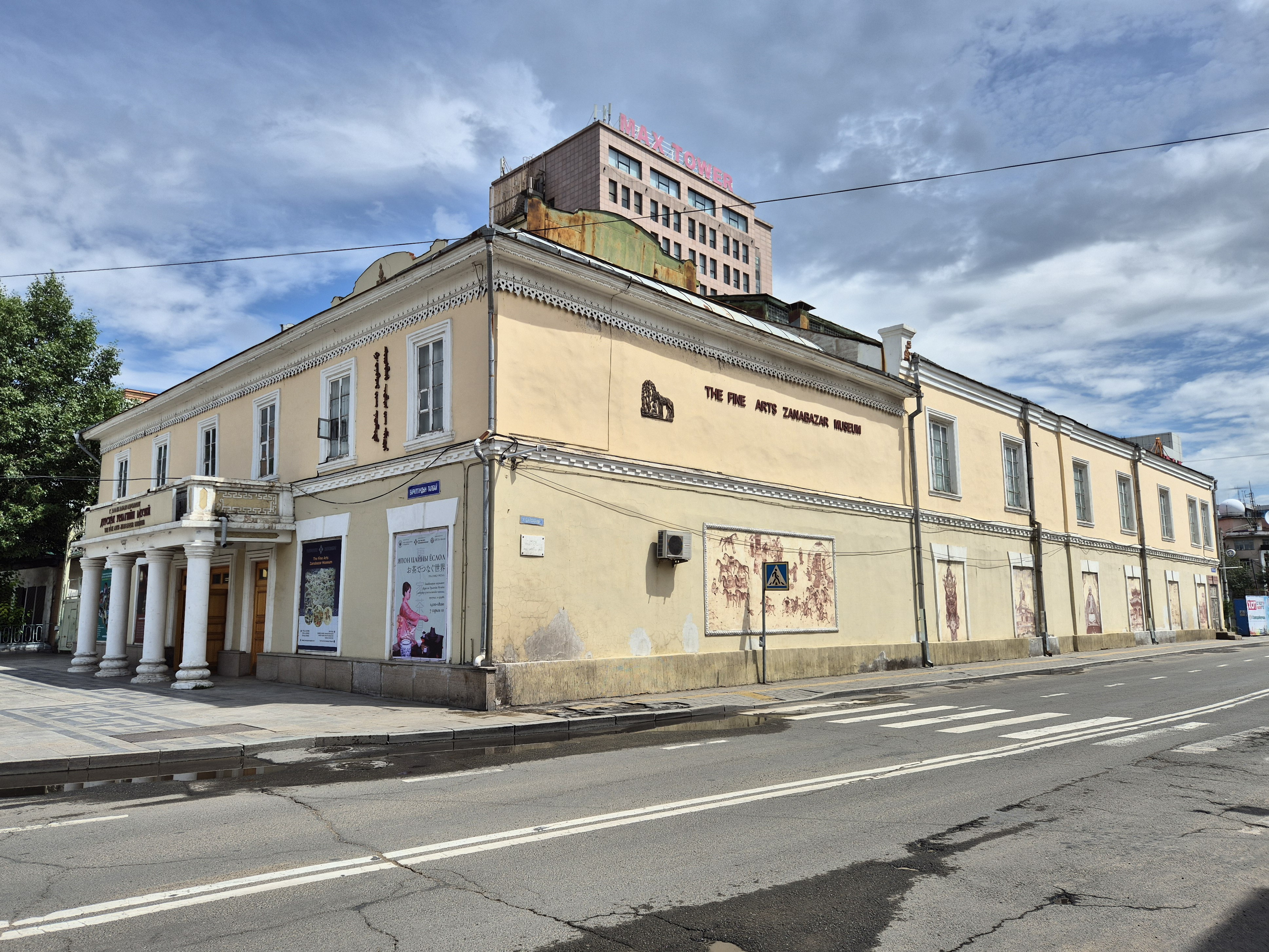
The Epitaph of Pugu Yitu, dated 678 CE, is currently displayed in the Zanabazar Fine Arts Museum in Ulaanbaatar, Mongolia

=== Background ===
The Pugu people belonged to the Tiele Confederation that rebelled against the First Turkic Khaganate in 627. After the Eastern Turks were defeated by the Tang in May 630, the Pugu clan were subsumed by the Xueyantuo, a Turkic people who filled the power vacuum in northern Mongolia. The Pugu, Tongluo, and Xueyantuo each sent separate embassies to the Tang in 629 and the Uyghurs later sent one in 638 as well. The Tang supported rebellions among their subordinate tribes and together they defeated the Xueyantuo in August 646. The multi-pronged attack involving Tang infantry, Mohe troops, Uyghur, Tongluo, and Pugu cavalry destroyed the Xueyantuo. Among the Tang expeditionary army were other Turks in the Tang military such as Ashina She'er, the brother-in-law of Tang Taizong, and Zhishi Sili and Qibi Heli, also in-laws, who commanded an assortment of Turkic, foreign, and regular Tang troops.

The continued alliance between the Tiele and the Tang was sealed in a series of rituals following their victory over the Xueyantuo. The tribal leaders requested a visit to the Tang court. In response, Taizong travelled to Lingzhou for a preliminary meeting. The envoys of eleven tribes, including the Uyghurs, Pugu, and Qibi offered submission and tribute while the emperor treated them to a banquet. A Tang ambassador was sent to bestow imperial investiture on the tribal leaders. Several thousand Tiele dignitaries met with Taizong at Lingzhou in late October 464 to offer a ritual request to serve him: "Your slaves [subordinate vassals] beseech Heaven's Most August to serve as our Heavenly Qaghan (Tian Kehan 天可汗)".

In December, Taizong hosted a banquet in Chang'an for the 11 Tiele chiefs including Eltabar Tumidu of the Uyghurs and Eltabar Gelan Bayan, the grandfather of Pugu Yitu. Taizong gifted them valuable items, including silk robes, gold and silver, and precious swords. In February 647, the Tiele chiefs were appointed as imperial officials governing Jimi "bridle" counties, prefectures, and area commands. They were given the credentials of Tang officials in the form of bronze fish tallies to signify their status and identity. In practice, they retained their traditional leadership structure. Following the bestowal of credentials, there was a drinking party and finally, a ritual request from the chiefs for the creation of a postal relay system from central Mongolia to Shanyu Plateau.

The Tiele were divided into six area commands and seven prefectures under the Yanran Protectorate (later renamed to Hanhai and Anbei), located at the Shanyu Plateau north of Wuyuan and west of Baotou. The Uyghurs were organized into the Hanhai Area Command ("Hanhai" referring to the Gobi Desert) covering Mongolia. The Uyghur elteber Tumidu was named Hanhai commander-in-chief. Their administration was indirect. However a road with 68 relay stations linking Uyghur territory to Chang'an was built for them to send tribute missions. According to Jonathan Karam Skaff, the Tiele were "self-governing vassals of the Tang".

=== Pugu Yitu's career ===
Pugu Yitu, his father Sifu (Si beg), and grandfather Gelan Bayan, were Turkic rulers who had gained Tang recognition under the Jimi loose reign system. The Pugu were one of the most important constituents of the Tiele Confederation under the Xueyantuo and comprised 30,000 tents and 10,000 soldiers. Their leaders held high ranking Turkic titles such as irkin or eltabar. In 647, the Pugu clan accepted the Tang as their suzerain and received the title of dudu (commander-in-chief). Gelan Bayan was succeeded by his son, Sifu, who governed until 657, and his son Pugu Yitu succeeded him, ruling as dudu until 678. Pugu Yitu was 44 years old when he died, making him 22 or 23 years old when he succeeded his father.

After his father's death, Sifu had an audience with the Tang emperor sometime in the 650s and paid obeisance to him. The epitaph then shifts the focus to Pugu Yitu, who is described as brave and skilled at riding and shooting. As a young boy he practiced with the bow while riding on sheep. Unlike his father and grandfather, Pugu Yitu was raised in the Tang palace during his youth. Pugu Yitu was appointed to rule the Pugu after his father's death. According to the records, he was a confident leader who aligned himself with Tang foreign policy and aided them several times in military expeditions. He participated in the Tang campaigns against the Western Turks in 658 as well as Tang wars against the Tibetan Empire in 666 and 670. The epitaph describes the Pugu forces as an "army of fierce bears" that suppressed the Western Turks and claims that Pugu Yitu attacked the camp of the Western Turks, capturing their banner.

Pugu Yitu was promoted several times. He attended Tang Gaozong's Feng Shan sacrifices from late 665 to early 666, taking him from Luoyang to Mount Tai. However, he is not listed as one of the official invitees, indicating that he may have been considered a Tang military officer. The epitaph depicts him as a vassal bearing tribute who attended the celebration tour and took part in the ritual sacrifice of oxen.

After the Feng Shan rites, Pugu Yitu participated in two more Tang campaigns. The first was an attack on the Mohe people to the northeast and likely refers to the Tang conquest of Goguryeo in 668. Qibi Heli defeated the Mohe allies of Goguryeo in 667 and had Tiele forces under his command, which may have included the Pugu. Next, Pugu Yitu served on a campaign against the Tibetan Empire, most likely referring to an unsuccessful expedition in 670 led by Ashina Daozhen, the son of Ashina She'er. By the time of his death, Pugu Yitu held the titles of Supreme Pillar of the State and dynasty-founding duke of Linzhong County with an appanage of 1,000 households.

According to the epitaph, Pugu Yitu was respectful of Tang imperial culture and loyal to China. Yılmaz suggests that Pugu Yitu was actually related to the Tang royal house by blood through her mother, who may have been a Tang princess, which explains why Pugu Yitu was so aligned with Tang policies. However, his remains were not found in his tomb, which may indicate that members of the Pugu clan who prepared the tomb wanted to bury him according to Turkic customs rather than in a Chinese style tomb. This would explain why cremated remains were found in the second tomb if that was the burial place of Pugu Yitu's mother, supposing she was a Tang princess.

=== Funeral ===
Pugu Yitu died on 27 March, 678 at the age of 44. According to the epitaph, Gaozong grieved for him and assigned Qu Zhao (nephew of the last king of Gaochang) to supervise the condolence rites, which likely explains the Chinese designs of the two Shoroon tombs. In addition, the Tang government paid for all funerary expenses. The Tang dispatched artisans as part of the condolence delegation on two other occasions, after the deaths of Kul Tigin in 731 and Bilge Qaghan in 734. Kul Tigin's Chinese inscription states that his brother Bilge Qaghan requested the Tang to send artisans to build a mausoleum decorated with paintings and sculptures as well as well as a stone inscription. The Turkic inscription on the other hand warns the Turks to be on guard against the Tang. Pugu Yitu's tomb did not contain a Turkic inscription.

The funeral was held in early September and the tomb was likely constructed afterwards. The ceremonies lasted ten days from 31 August 31 to 9 September. The death rites combined elements from both Tang and Turkic traditions. His family received as condolence payment 300 lengths of textiles, one silk polychrome robe, one gold belt, a set of bow and arrows, a quiver, and one saddle and saddle blanket. This indicates that the Tang condolence party understood Turkic customs as the gifts are typical artifacts found in contemporary Turkic tombs. However none of the mentioned buried artifacts survived since the tomb was looted and they were made of perishable materials.

=== Legacy ===
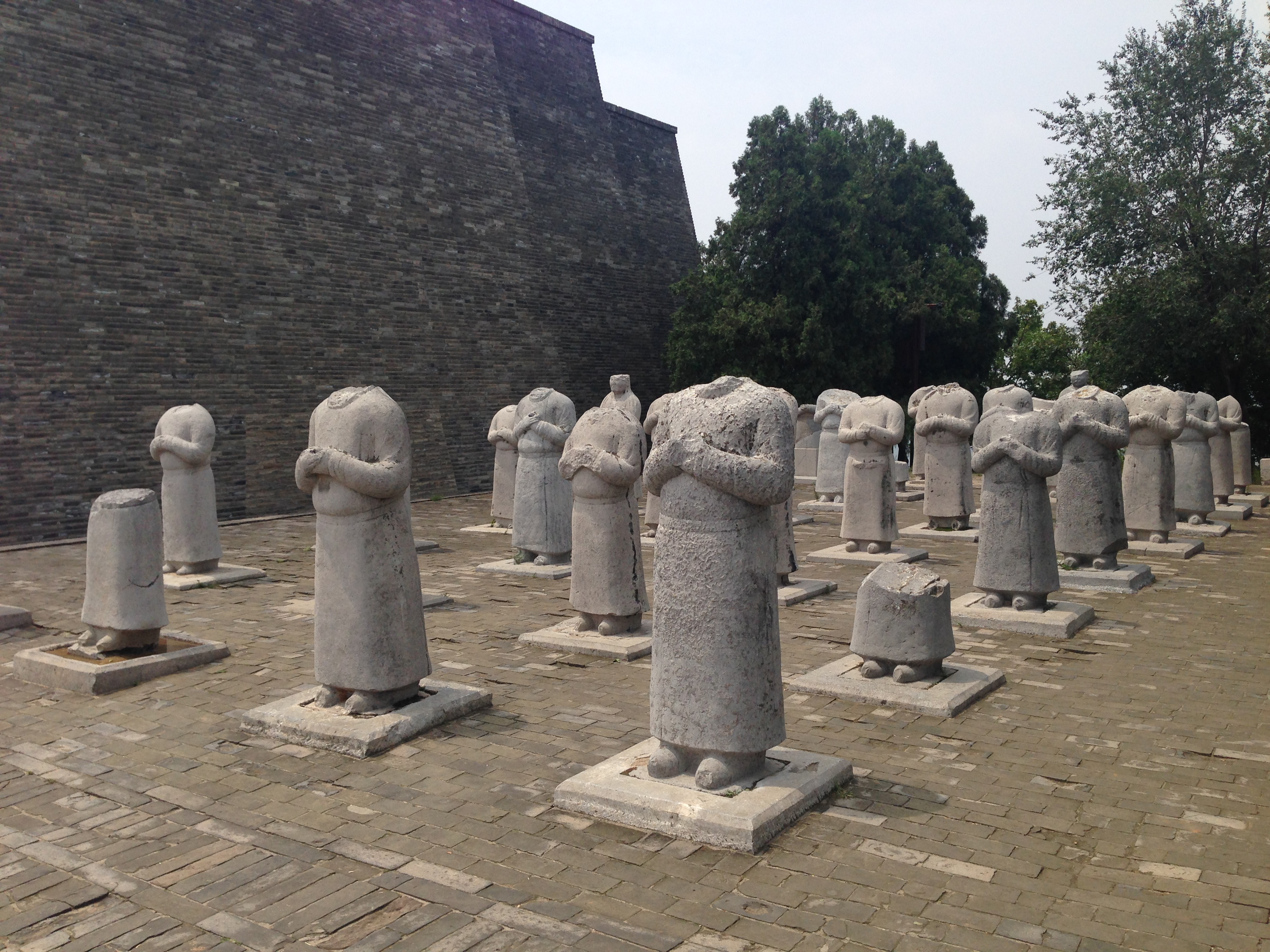
Statues of foreign dignitaries, including Pugu Yitu, at the Qianling Mausoleum

Pugu Yitu is included as a statue among 64 foreign dignitaries at the Qianling Mausoleum where Emperor Gaozong and Empress Wu Zetian are buried. Their son, Tang Zhongzong, ordered the 64 statues to be placed in two lines flanking the procession path leading to the southern gate. Only 61 statues exist today, all of them headless, and only 36 can still be identified by their name and title, including Pugu Yitu's. Most of them are military officers or rulers who had accepted Tang investiture or ambassadors from the Tibetan and Second Turkic empires.

== Artifacts from the tomb ==
The epitaph was found within the tomb of Pugu Yitu, also called the Shoroon Dov Kurgan. Many artifacts, especially terracotta statuettes, were found in the tomb.

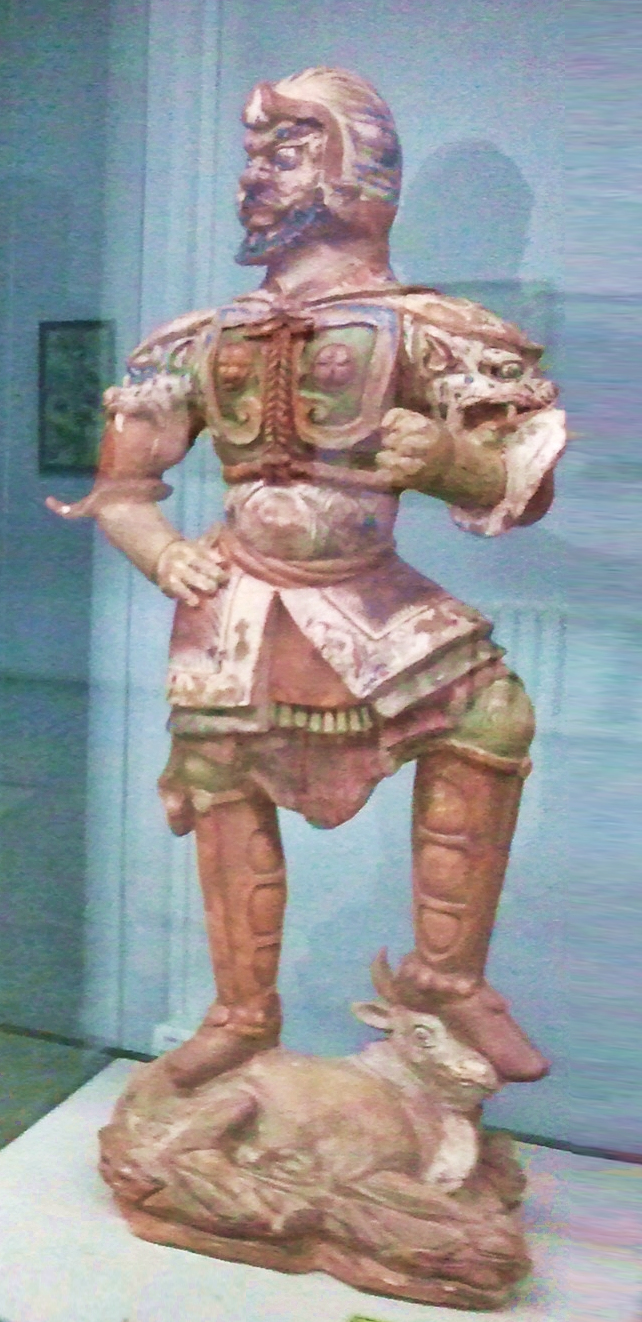
Shoroon Dov artifacts, Heavenly King (Tian Wang). Zanabazar Fine Arts Museum in Ulaanbaatar, Mongolia.

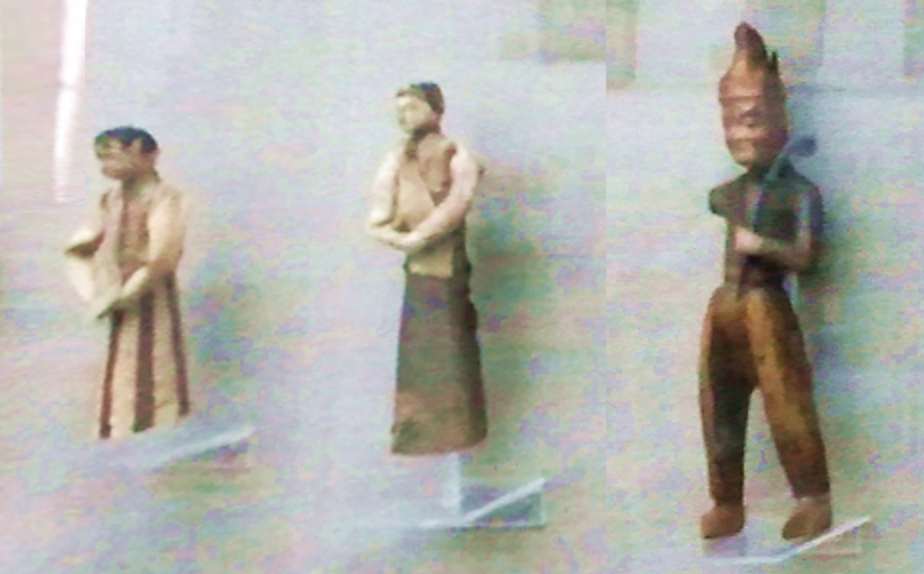
Shoroon Dov artifacts, female and male attendants, Central Asian (possibly Sogdian) figurines. Zanabazar Fine Arts Museum in Ulaanbaatar, Mongolia.

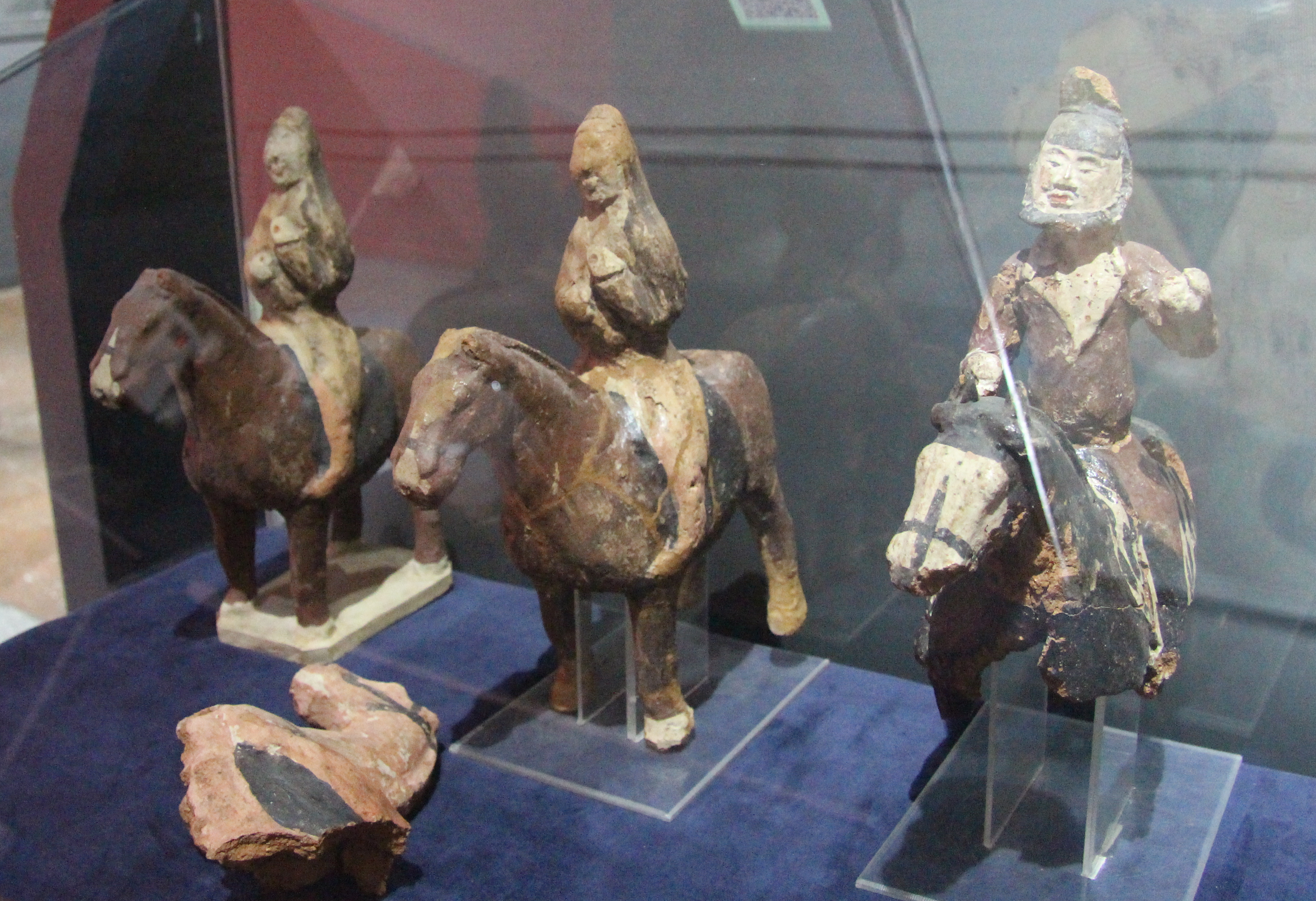
Statuettes of horsemen from the tomb.

== Bibliography ==
- Drompp, Michael Robert (2005), Tang China And The Collapse Of The Uighur Empire - A Documentary History, Brill.
- Schottenhammer, Angela (2023), China and the Silk Roads (ca. 100 BCE to 1800 CE): Role and Content of Its Historical Access to the Outside World, Brill
- Skaff, Jonathan Karam (2012), Sui-Tang China and Its Turko-Mongol Neighbors - Culture, Power, and Connections, 580-800 (Oxford Studies in Early Empires), Oxford University Press.
- Skaff, Jonathan Karam (2026), Silk Roads, Steppe Roads: History Unearthed from the Tombs of Medieval China, Princeton University Press
- Wang, Zhenping (2013), Tang China in Multi-Polar Asia - A History of Diplomacy and War, University of Hawaii Press.
- Xiong, Victor Cunrui (2008), Historical Dictionary of Medieval China, United States of America: Scarecrow Press, ISBN 978-0810860537.
- Yang, Shao-yun (2023), Early Tang China and the World, 618–750 CE, Cambridge University Press
