= Dongyi Protectorate =

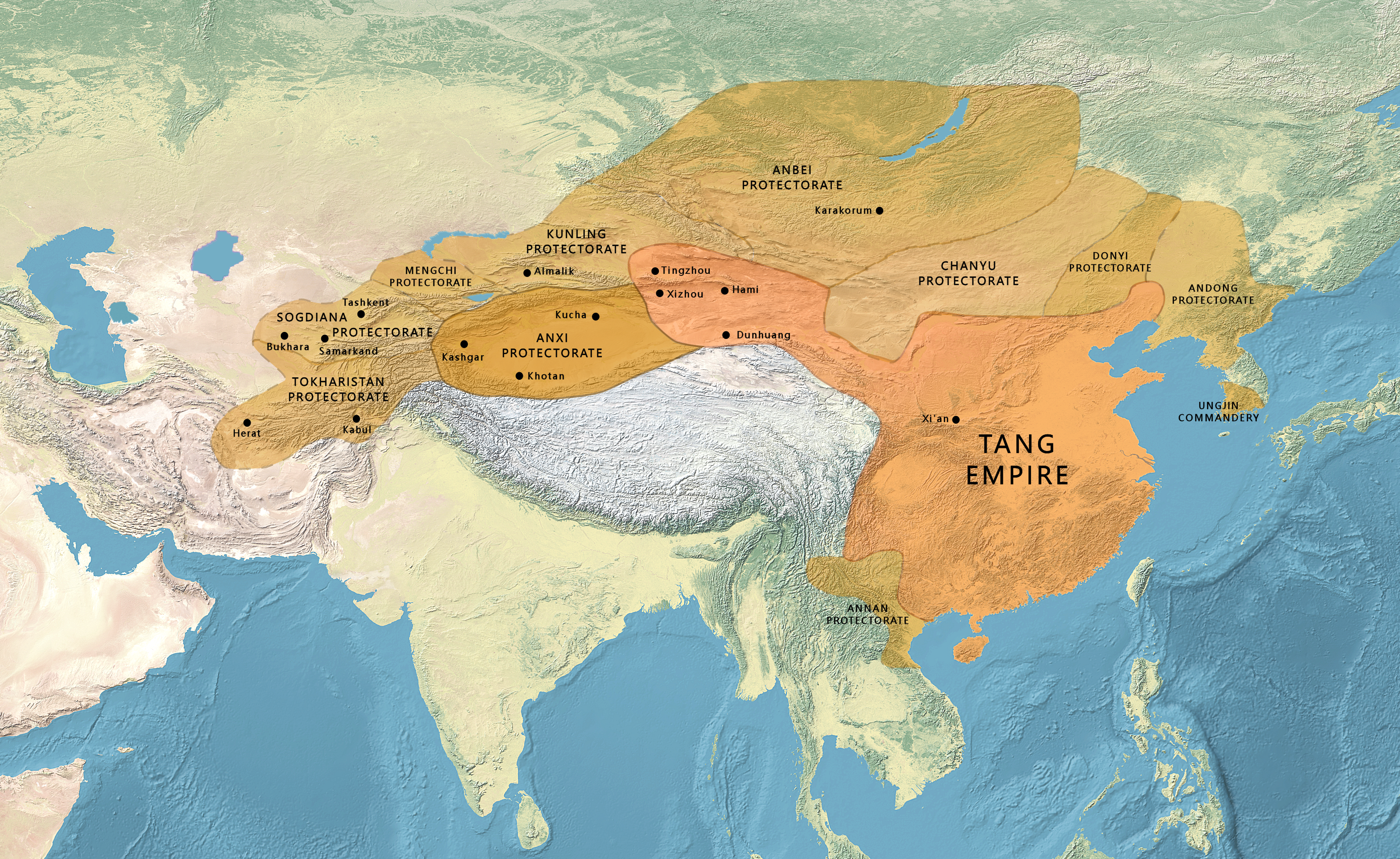
Map of the Tang Empire and its Protectorates circa 660 CE.

The Dongyi Protectorate (Chinese: 東夷都護府; lit. 'Protectorate of the Eastern Barbarians') from 618 to 907 AD, was a Tang dynasty protectorate in present-day Hebei Province and eastern Inner Mongolia. In 648, Emperor Taizong of Tang established the Jiaole Area Command and appointed the Xi chief Kotuche (可度者) as its military governor. In 648, Taizong created the Songmo Area Command and "diplomatically" appointed Kuko (窟哥), chieftain of the Khitans as its Military Governor. In reality, the Tang court had lost actual control of the area. After the Tang dynasty collapsed, the area became the territory of the Khitan-led Liao dynasty.
