= Fine Arts Zanabazar Museum =

Museum in Chingeltei, Ulaanbaatar, Mongolia

Coordinates: 47.9202°N 106.9097°E

The Fine Arts Zanabazar Museum

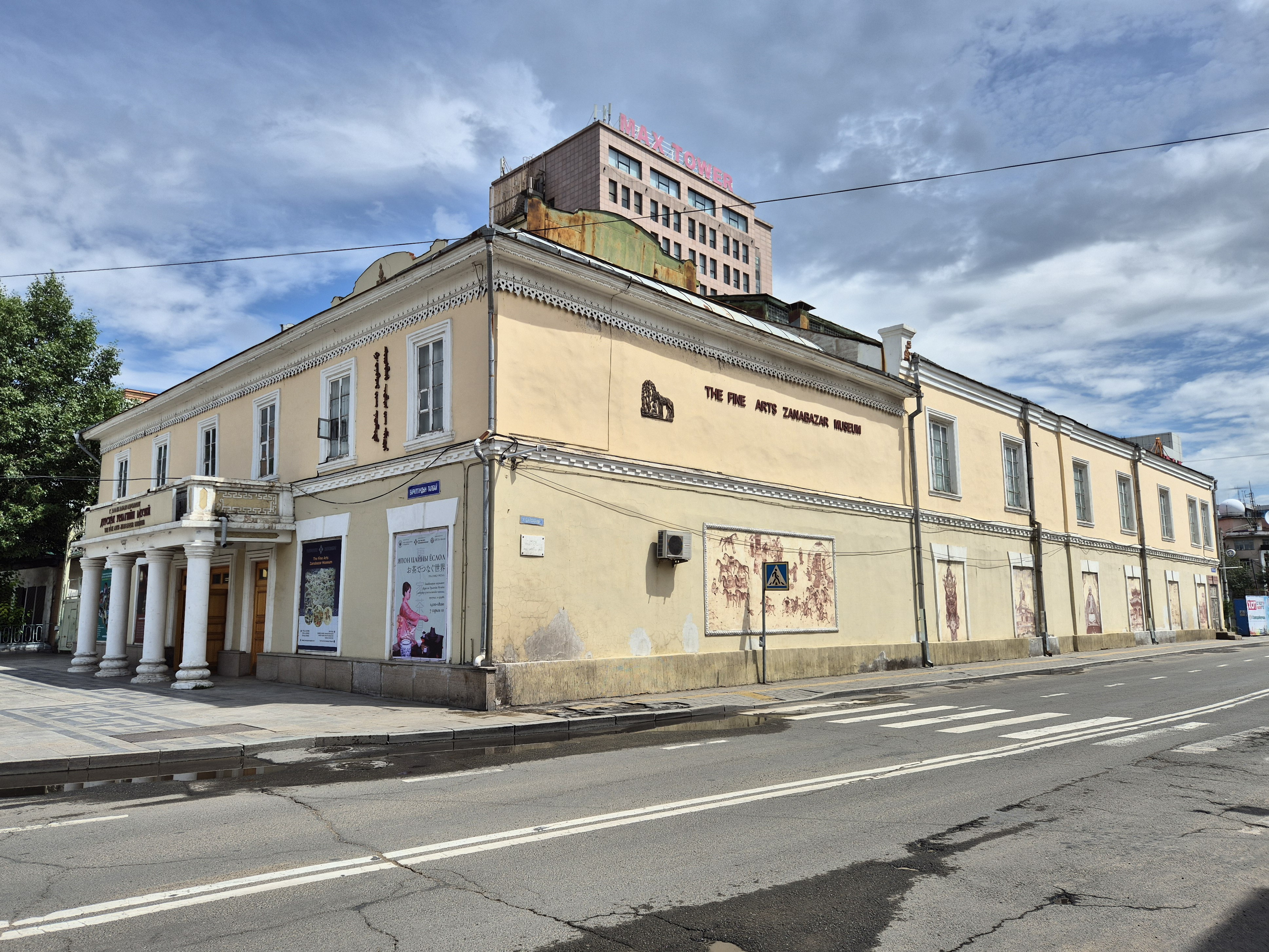
- Established: July 1966
- Location: Chingeltei, Ulaanbaatar, Mongolia
- Type: Art Museum
- Website: en.zanabazarmuseum.mn

The Fine Arts Zanabazar Museum (Mongolian: Занабазарын нэрэмжит Дүрслэх урлагийн музей) is an art museum located in Chingeltei District, Ulaanbaatar, Mongolia, and founded in 1966. It exhibits collections of Mongolian masters of fine arts from the 18th to the 20th century and works in cooperation with the UNESCO for improving the presentation of its collections.

== History ==
The building where the museum is located was built by a Russian merchant in 1905. During this time it was used as a bank. In 1965, the chairman of the Mongolian Craftsmen's Union Committee proposed the idea of creating an art museum to help preserve Mongolia's heritage. On July 23, 1966, the museum opened to the public for the first time. In the period from 1966 to 1989, the museum's exhibitions were held in Moscow, Kyiv, Sofia, Bratislava, Baku, Budapest, Saint Petersburg, Tashkent, Ulan-Ude and Erfurt. In 1968, about 194 exhibitions from the People's Republic of China were transferred, being the first exhibition of foreign art. In March 1969, 76 works were transferred from the Indian Handicrafts Exhibition. In 1995, the museum was named "Zanabazar Museum" in honor of Zanabazar.

During the 1990s, the museum received various historical and cultural artifacts to complete the collections of the exhibits. In a 1993 exhibition, the museum displayed a collection of religious objects that were hidden during the period of the Mongolian People's Republic in the Gobi Desert, which were recovered. In 2015, the museum joined the Google Arts & Culture platform and added a virtual tour of the museum's rooms using an adapted version of Google Street View.

== Collections ==
The museum has 12 exhibition halls with a selection of more than 20,000 exhibits from the Lower Paleolithic to the early twentieth century. Since 2004, the museum has been successfully implementing the UNESCO project "Development of Museums and Protection of Nomadic Cultural Heritage", which provides exhibit and cartography, preservation and protection of treasures, and training for staff. The museum has collections of paintings, statues, thangkas, masks and costumes. The museum contains exhibits about Tsam masks and clothing. The museum also contains 19th century paintings by Marzan Sharav. Sharav's most notable painting in the museum is "A Day in Mongolia", in addition the museum in other exhibits contains a mandala made of gold and silver. The museum contains various artifacts such as sculptures, ritual instruments, stone engravings, Buddhist paintings, sets of knives and head ornaments. The museum contains statues of Sita Tara, Bodhi Stupa and Five Dhayani Buddhas. The museum has a collection of percussion musical instruments used in Buddhist practices such as Vajra, Khengereg, Kharanga, Duudaram and Damar. The museum presents a collection of Xiongnu ceramics. The museum contains Tsagaan Uvgun's sculptures. The museum collections date from different periods of Mongolian history in which there are artifacts from the Xiongnu, Uyghur and Turkic periods, the museum also has works of art by anonymous artists. Also the museum shows the development of fine arts in Mongolia during the 20th century. The museum has a saddle of the Mongol Empire.

== Gallery ==
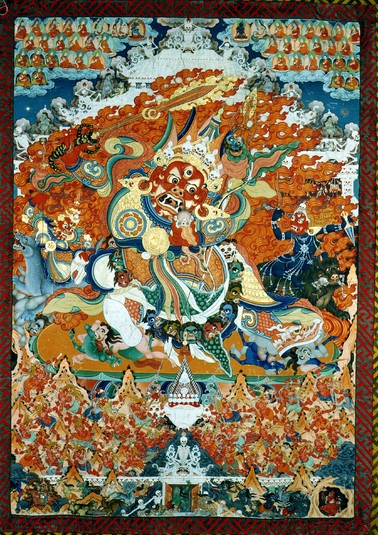
Thangka of Begtse

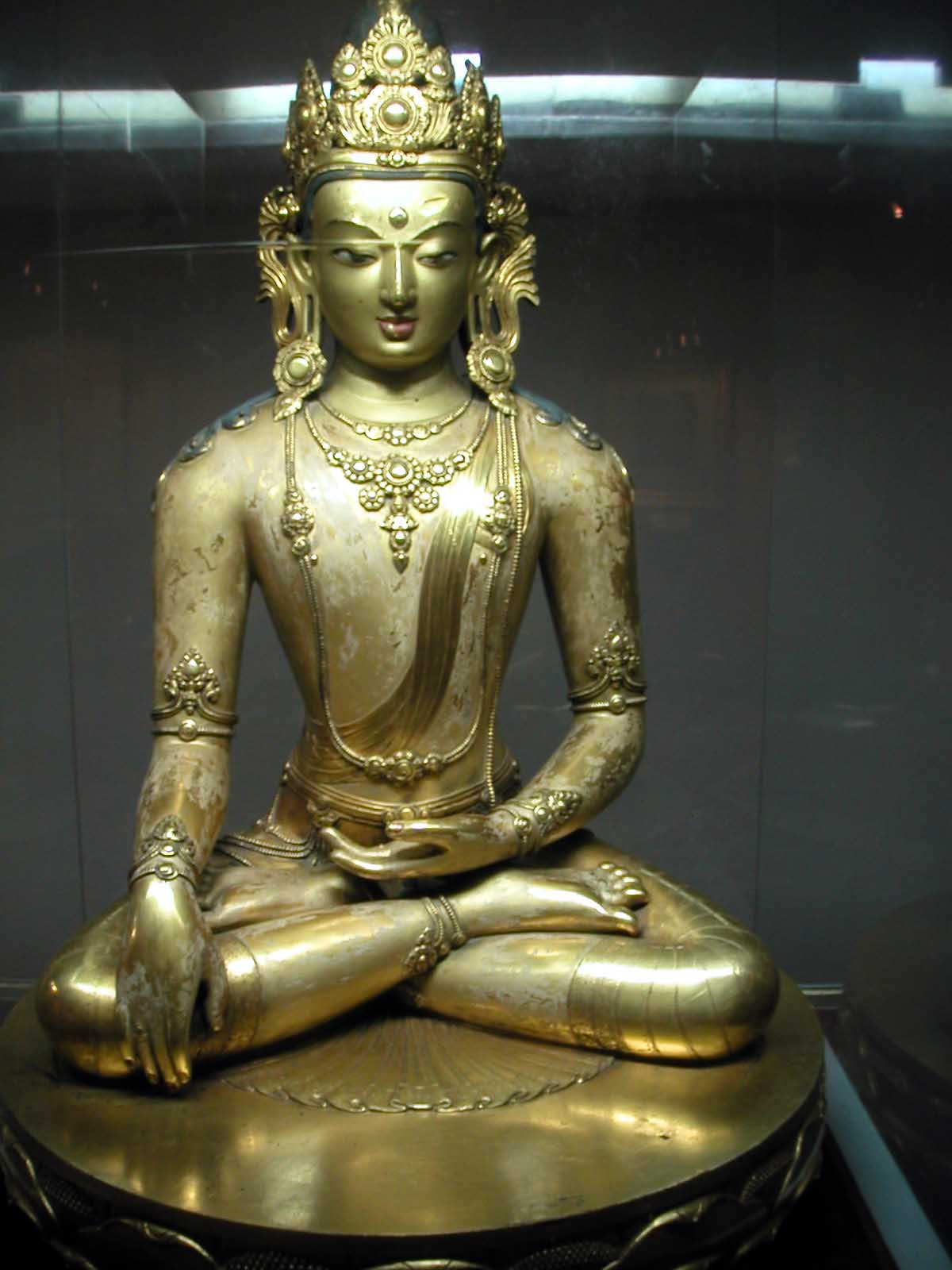
Buddha statue

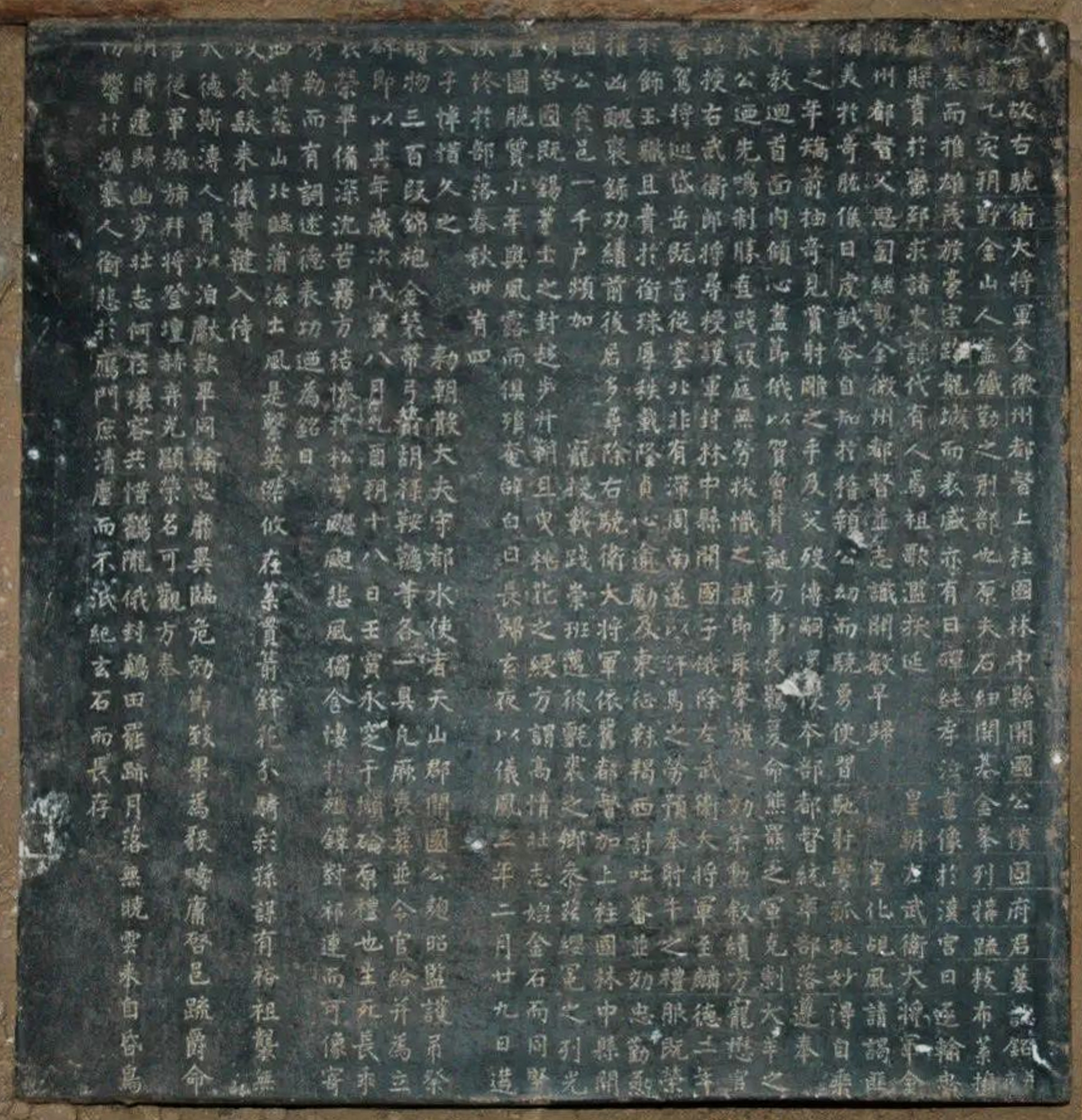
Epitaph of Pugu Yitu.

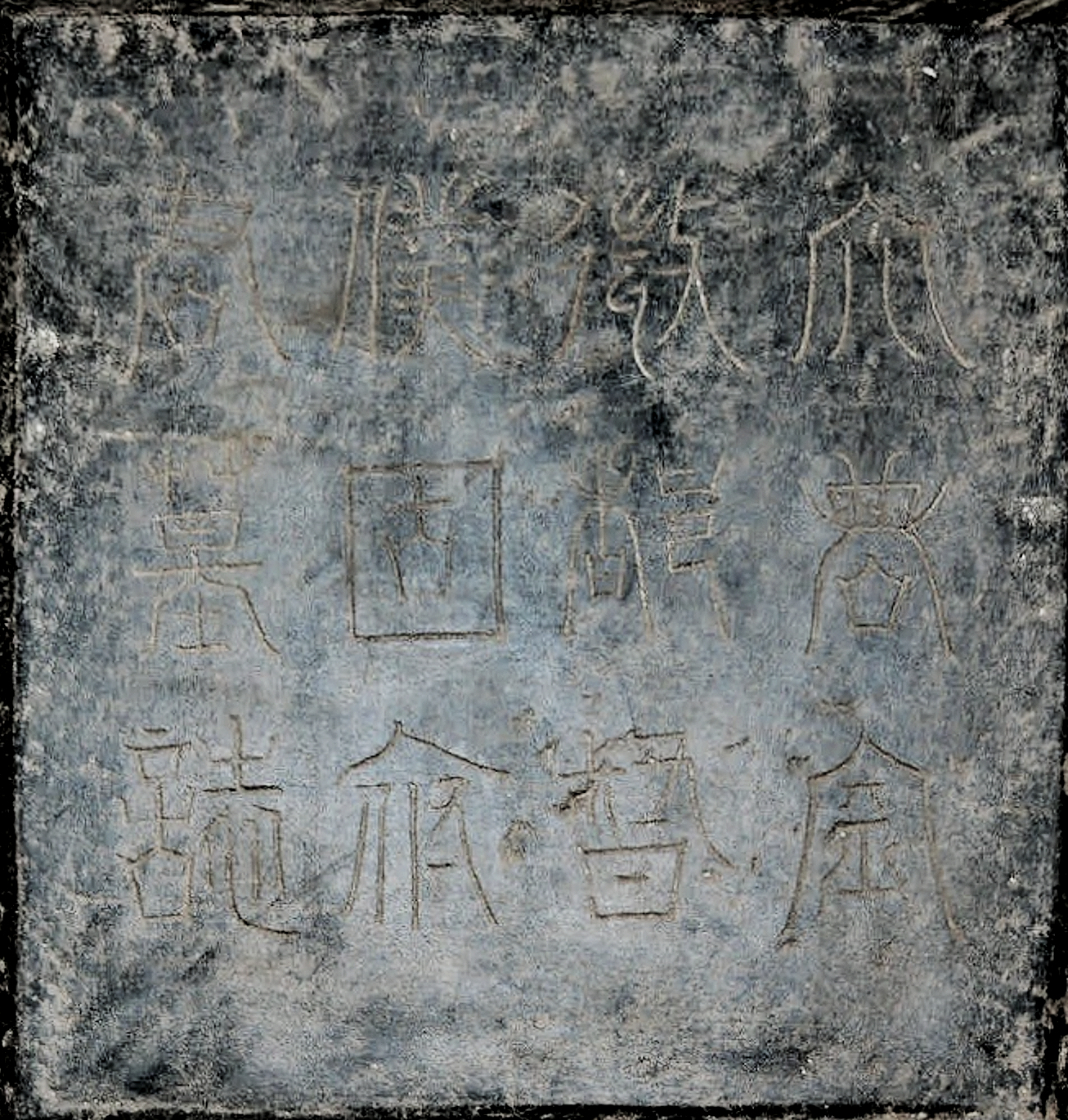
Epitaph cover of Pugu Yitu.
