= Kharakhorum Museum =

Museum in Kharkhorin, Övörkhangai, Mongolia

- Хархорин Музей
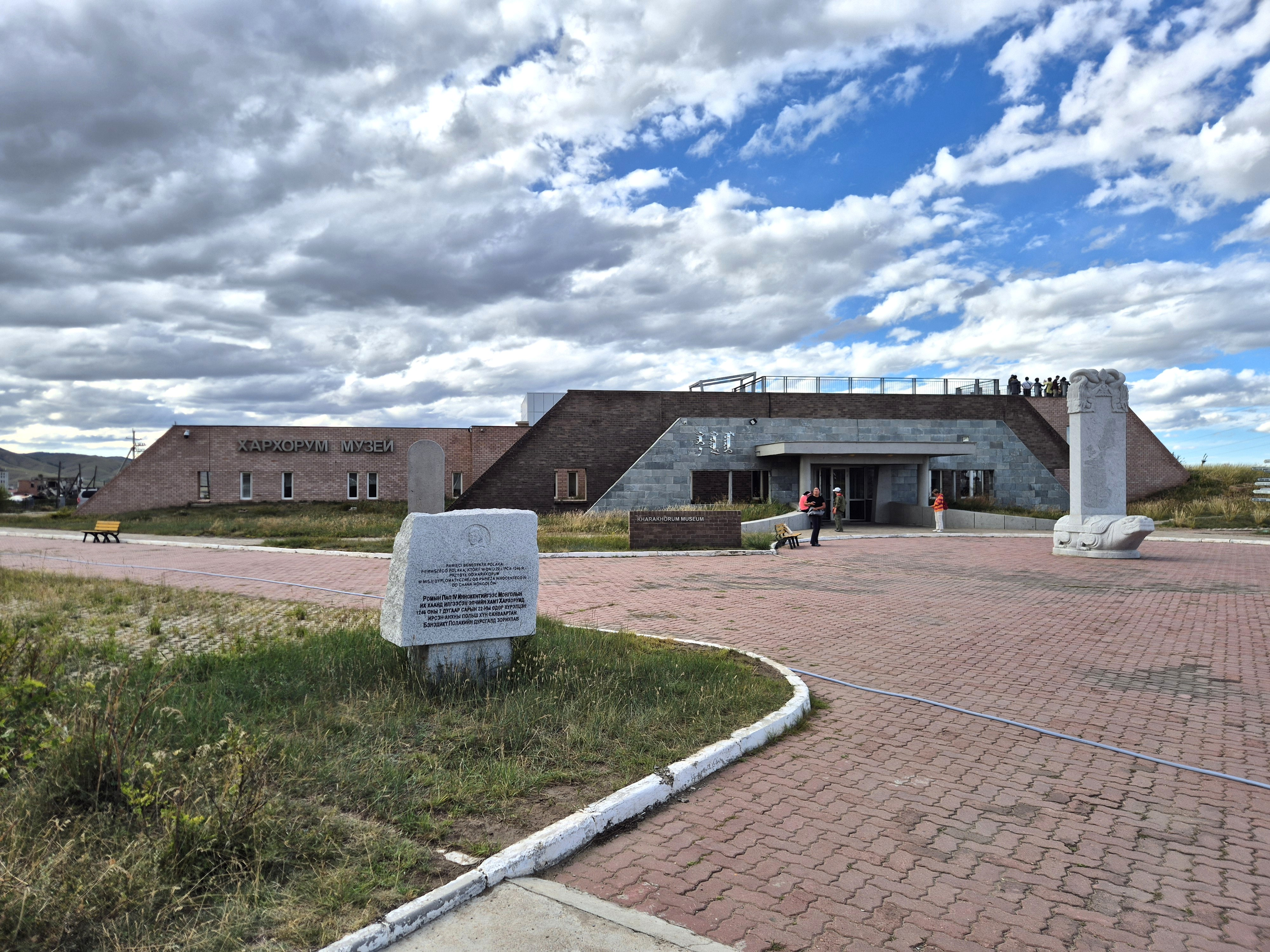
- Established: 8 June 2011; 15 years ago
- Location: Kharkhorin, Övörkhangai, Mongolia
- Coordinates: 47.195307°N 102.839280°E
- Type: history museum

The Kharakhorum Museum (Mongolian: Хархорин Музей) is a museum in Kharkhorin, Övörkhangai Province, Mongolia. The museum is dedicated to exhibiting artifacts from Mongolian history.

== History ==
Construction of the museum began in 2007 with funding from the Japan International Cooperation Agency and the Japanese government. In 2010, 10 artifacts from the Övörkhangai Province were donated by the Institute for the Study of Nomadic Civilizations. The Mongolian government invested 450 million tögrögs in the museum. The museum opened for the first time in 2011. The Japanese company Konoike was in charge of the construction of the museum. In 2021, a virtual museum exhibition funded by the Science and Technology Foundation and implemented by the National University of Mongolia was organized for the 800th anniversary of the founding of Kharkhorum.

== Collections ==
The museum contains artifacts from excavations in the ruins of Kharkhorum. The museum contains artifacts from the Hunnu period, Liao dynasty, the Uyghur Khaganate, the Mongol Empire and Rouran Khaganate. In 2020, it was recorded that the museum contained 3128 artifacts, some of these dating from the Upper Paleolithic period to the 14th century. Among the exhibits is a copy of the Güyük Khan letter, which according to the notes of Giovanni da Pian del Carpine, this letter contains a seal made by a Russian craftsman named Kozma. In addition the museum contains an inscription of the monument of Karakoum, this inscription was created in 1347 under the Togoontumur Khaan reign, this artifact contains inscriptions in traditional Mongolian script and Chinese. This inscription was partly placed on the statue of a turtle, located in the Karakorum remains, the inscription tells about events in Mongolian history such as the construction of the Ten Thousand Tranquillity and Great Buddhist temples.

The monument was broken during an attack in 1380 by the Ming Dynasty. The pieces of this monument were kept in the Erdene Zuu Monastery. In addition, the museum contains seal with phags-pa script, this script is an ancient Mongolian writing method, it is considered as a very important artifact of this seal was used by a finance minister of the emperor of Northern Yuan dynasty Biligtü Khan Ayushiridara. The museum contains 300 Mongolian imperial coins with inscriptions in arabic and phags-pa script, found in Karakorum during 2000 to 2005. The museum also contains a Buddha sculpture, a Kalavinka sculpture, as well as porcelain belonging to the time of the Yuan and Song dynasties.

== Gallery ==
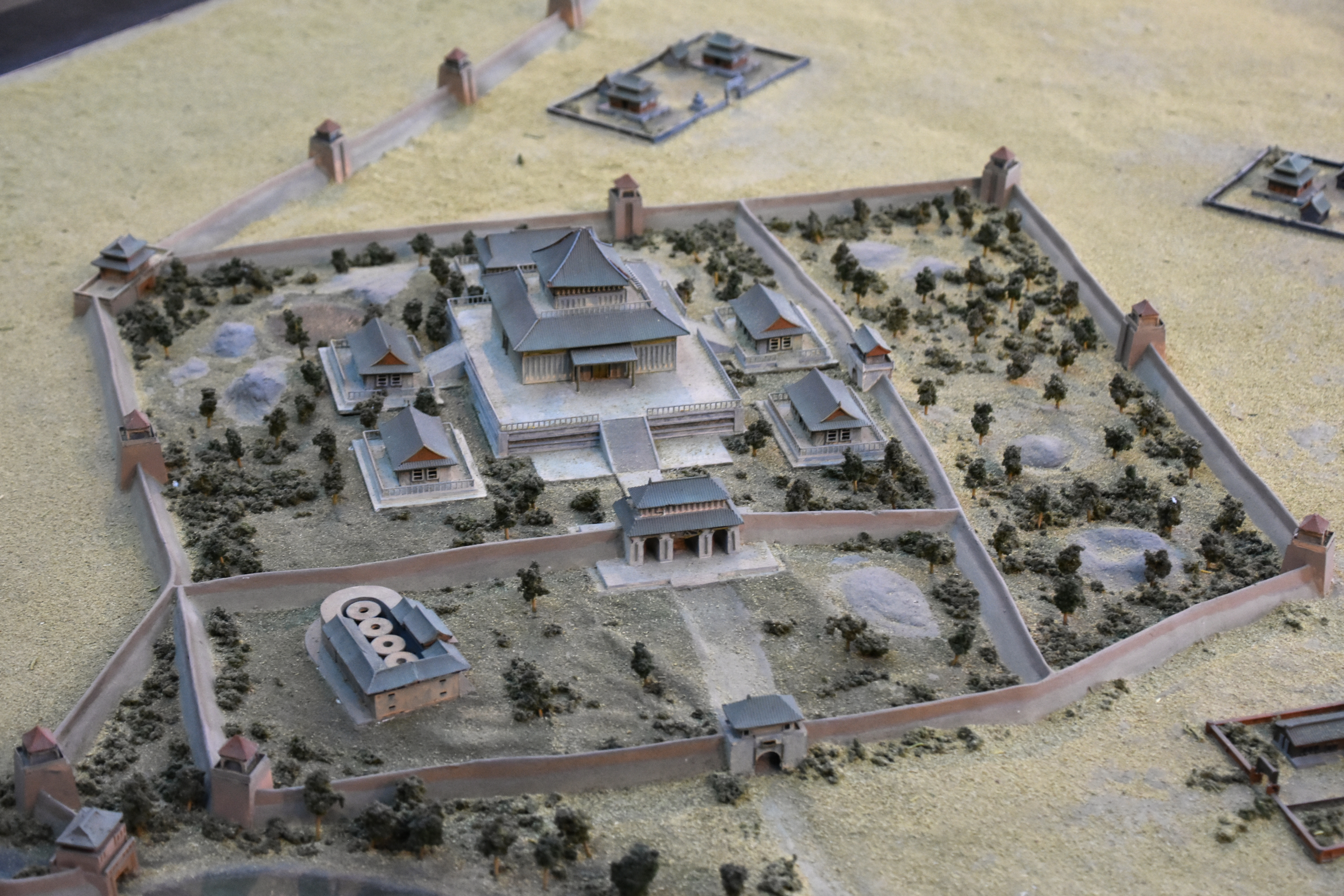
Model of Karakorum City

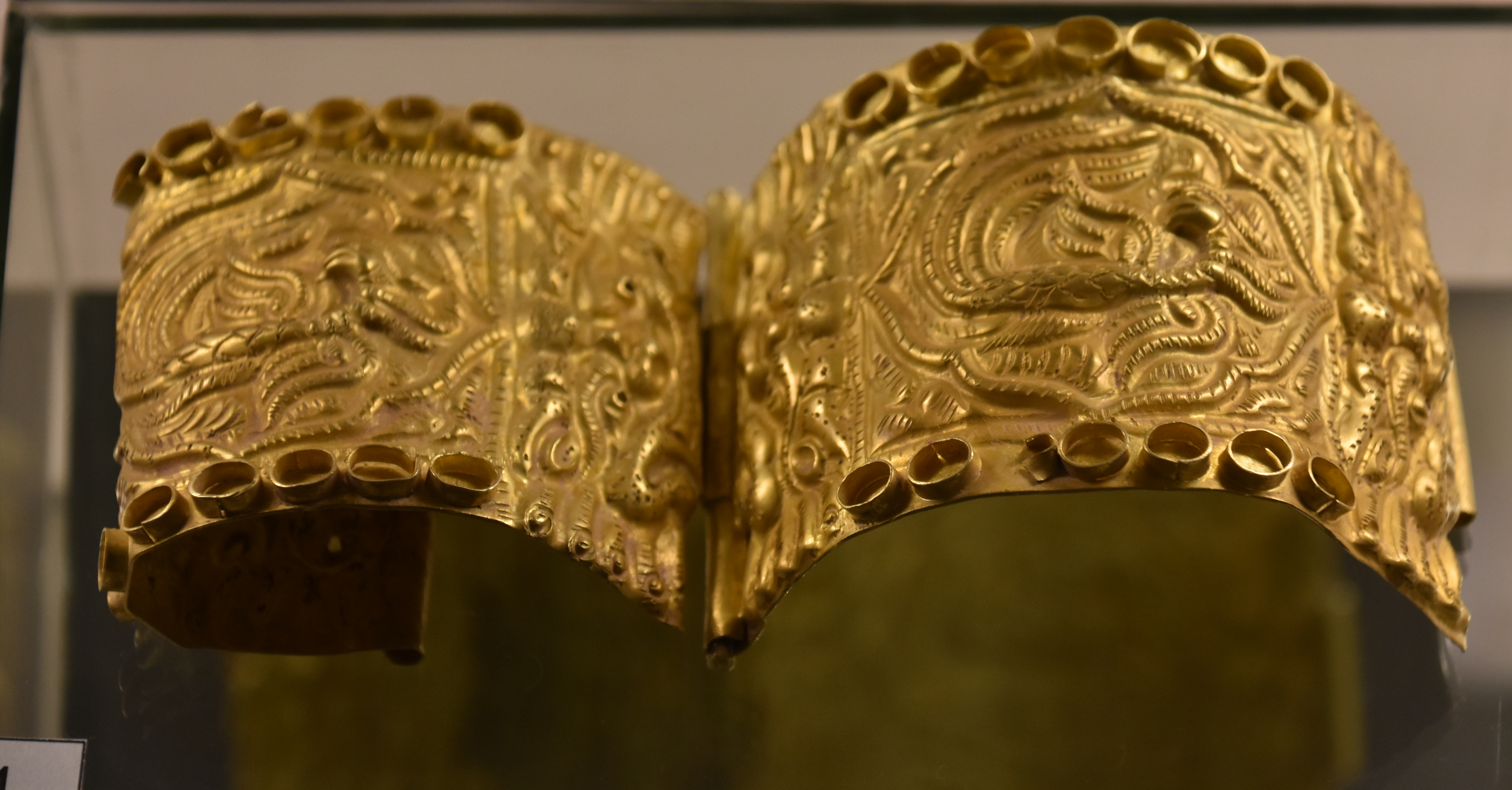
Gold bracelet dating from the Great Mongolian period (14th century)

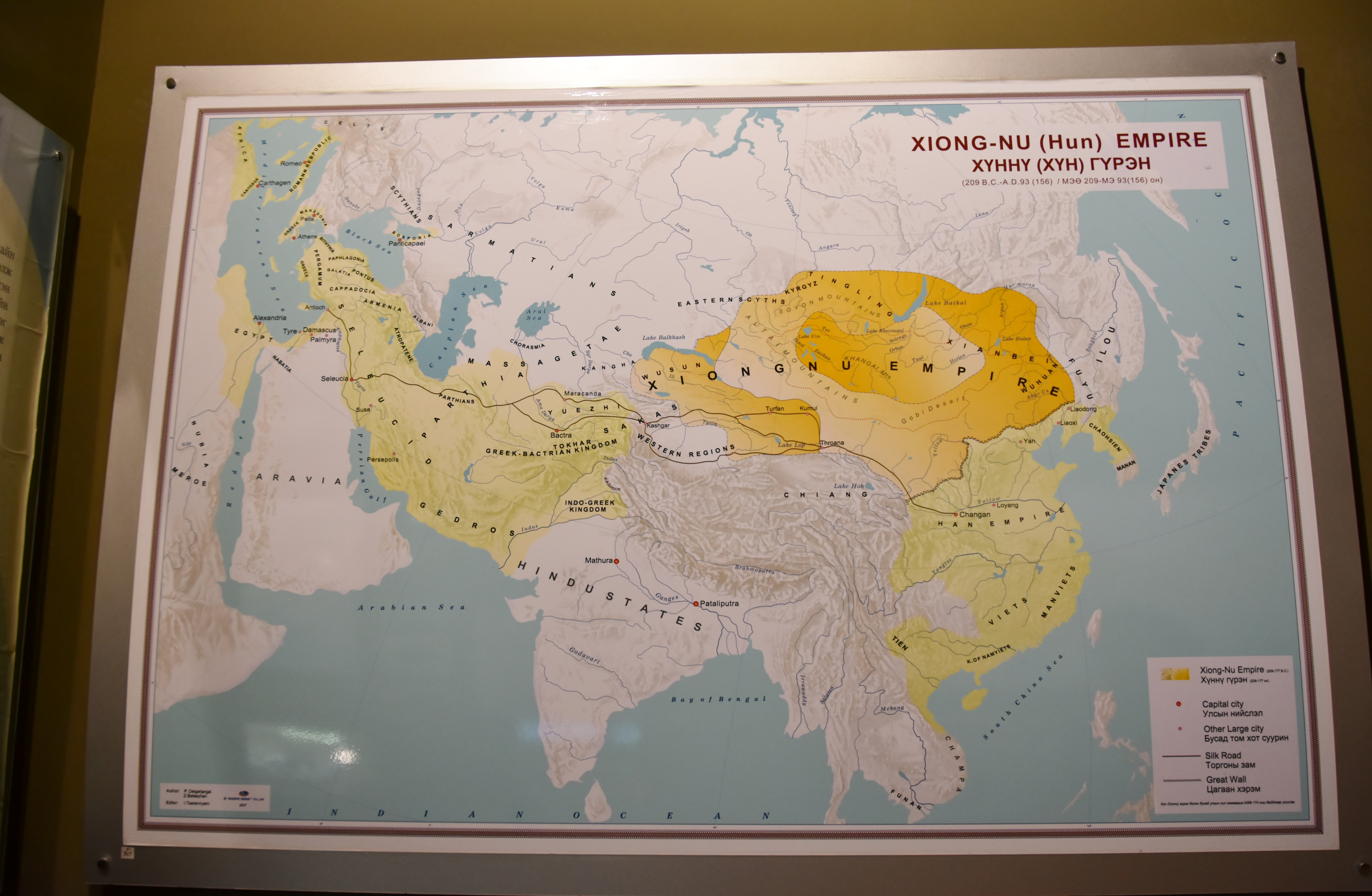
Map of the Xiongnu Empire

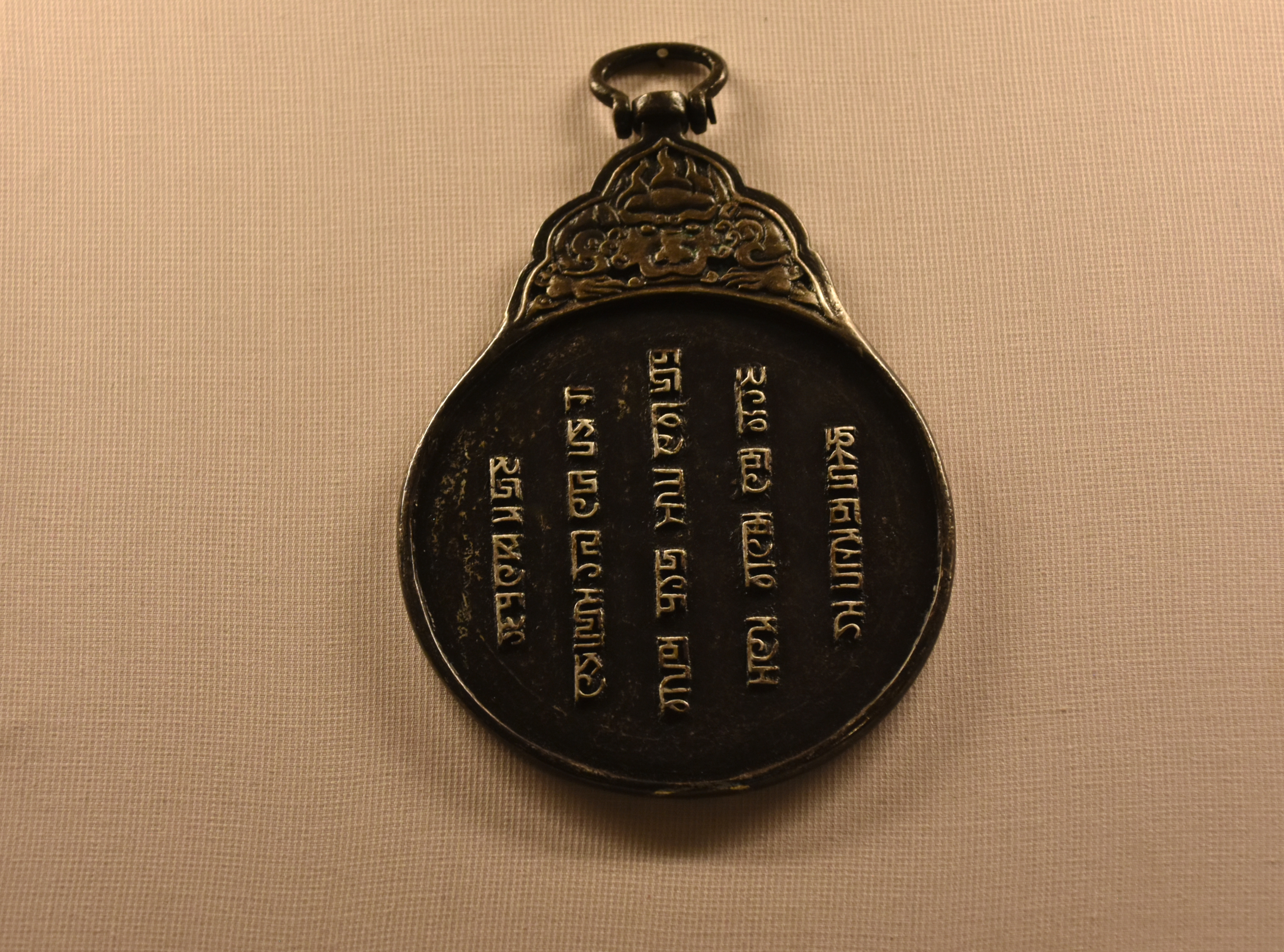
Mongol passport of Yuan Dynasty

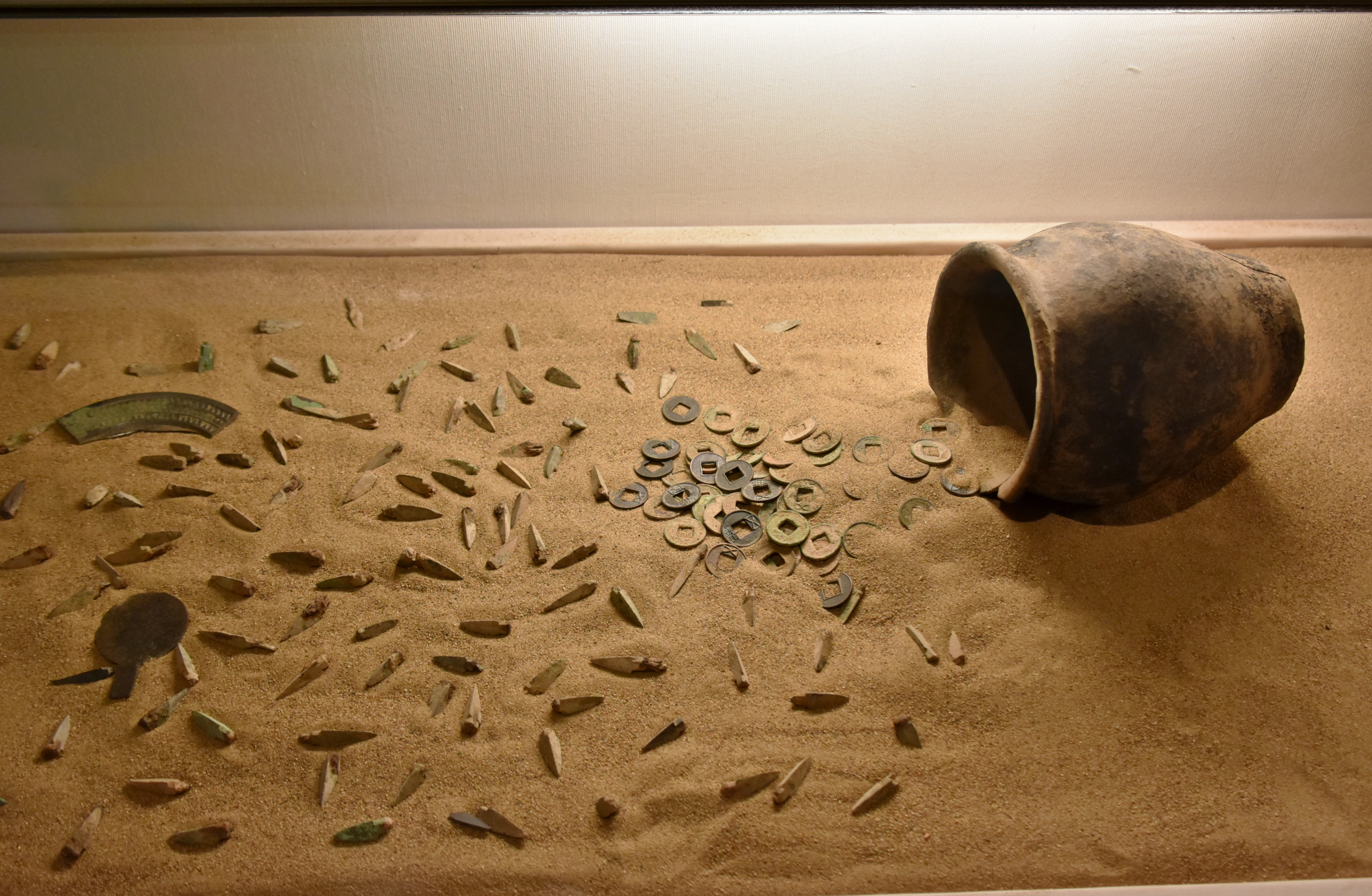
Finds from Xiong-nu Period

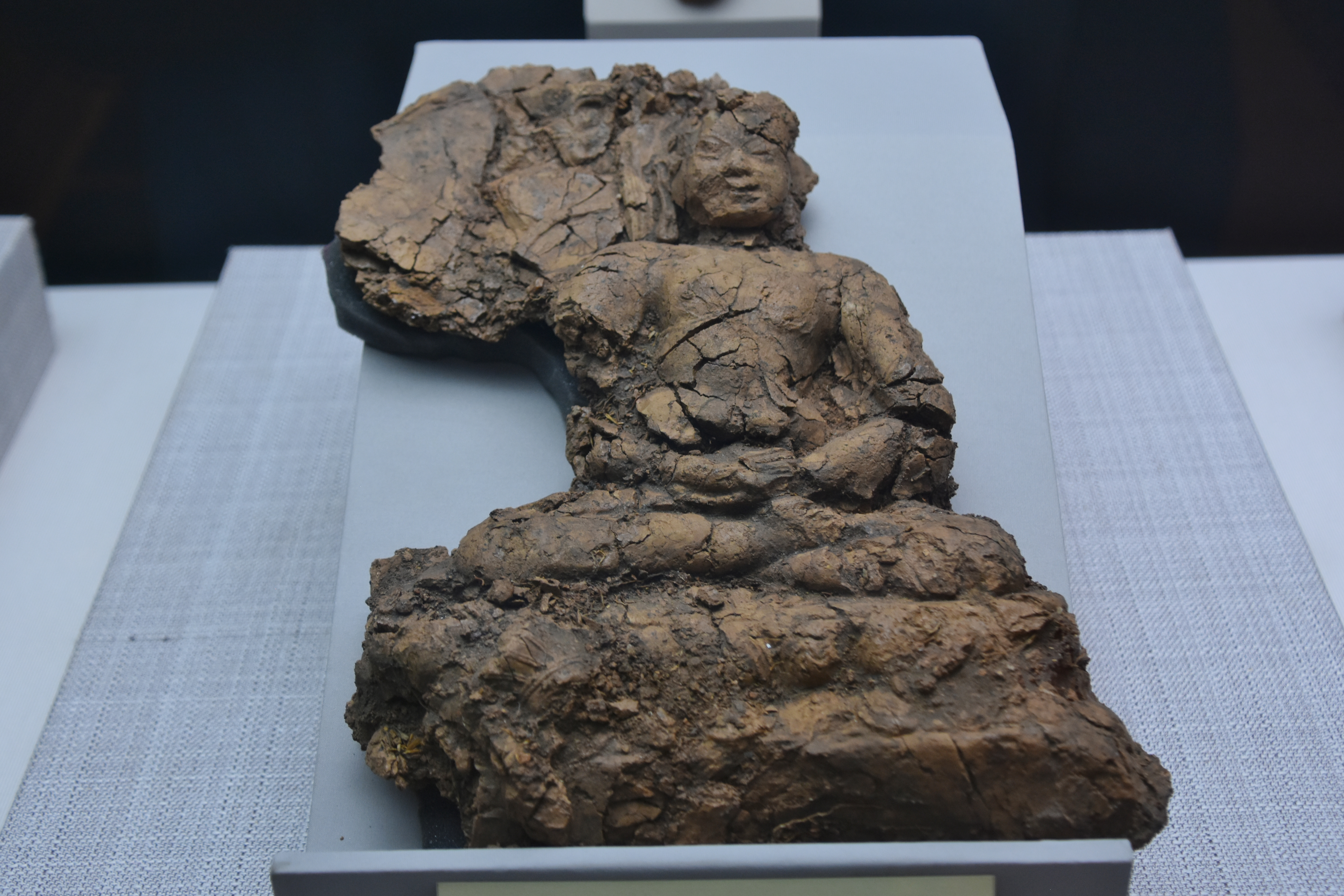
Buddha sculpture
