= Zaamar =

District in Töv, Mongolia

Coordinates: 48°13′00″N 104°46′26″E

Zaamar District Заамар сум ᠵᠠᠭᠠᠮᠠᠷᠰᠤᠮᠤ
- District
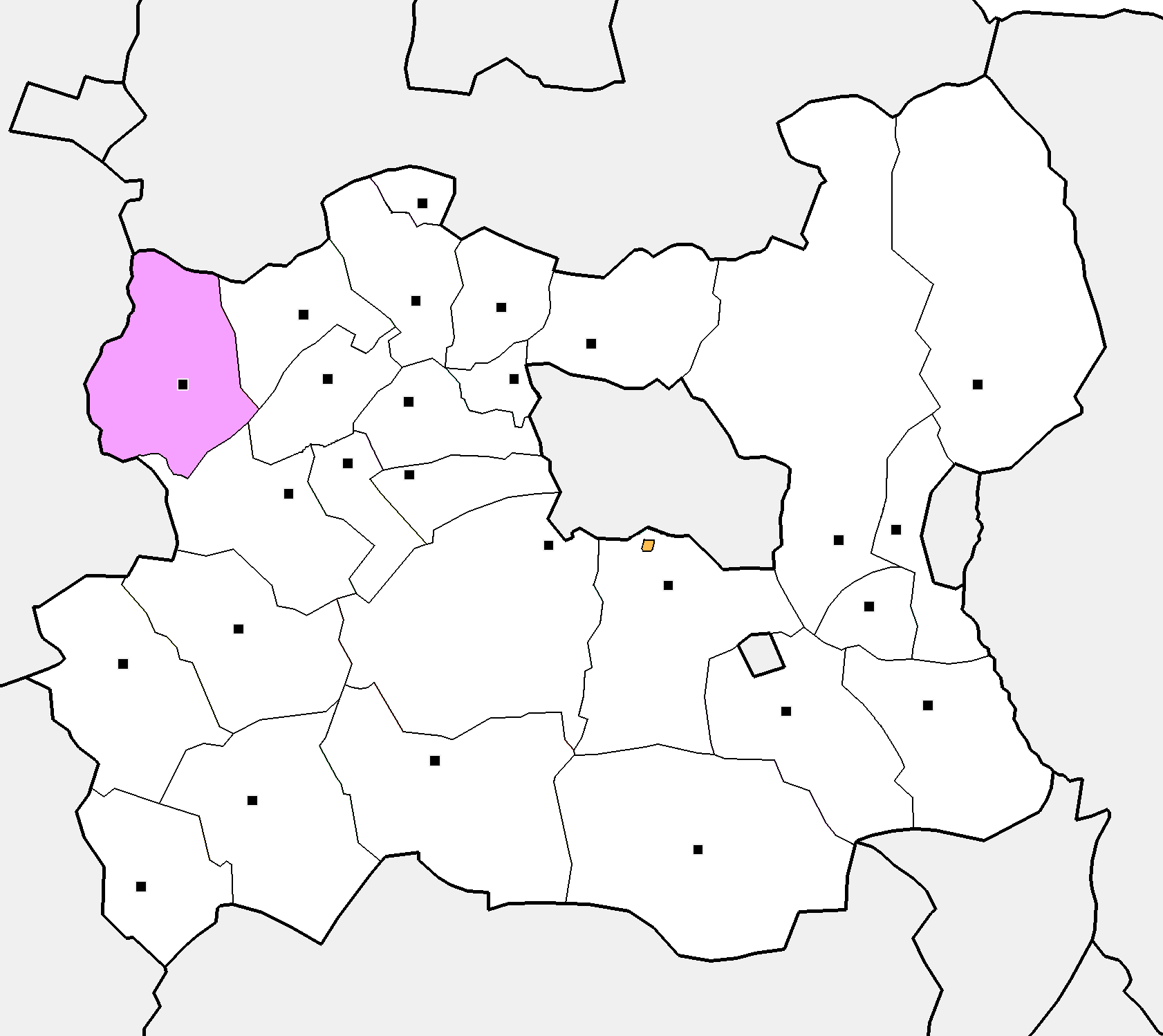
- Country: Mongolia
- Province: Töv Province
- Time zone: UTC+8 (UTC + 8)

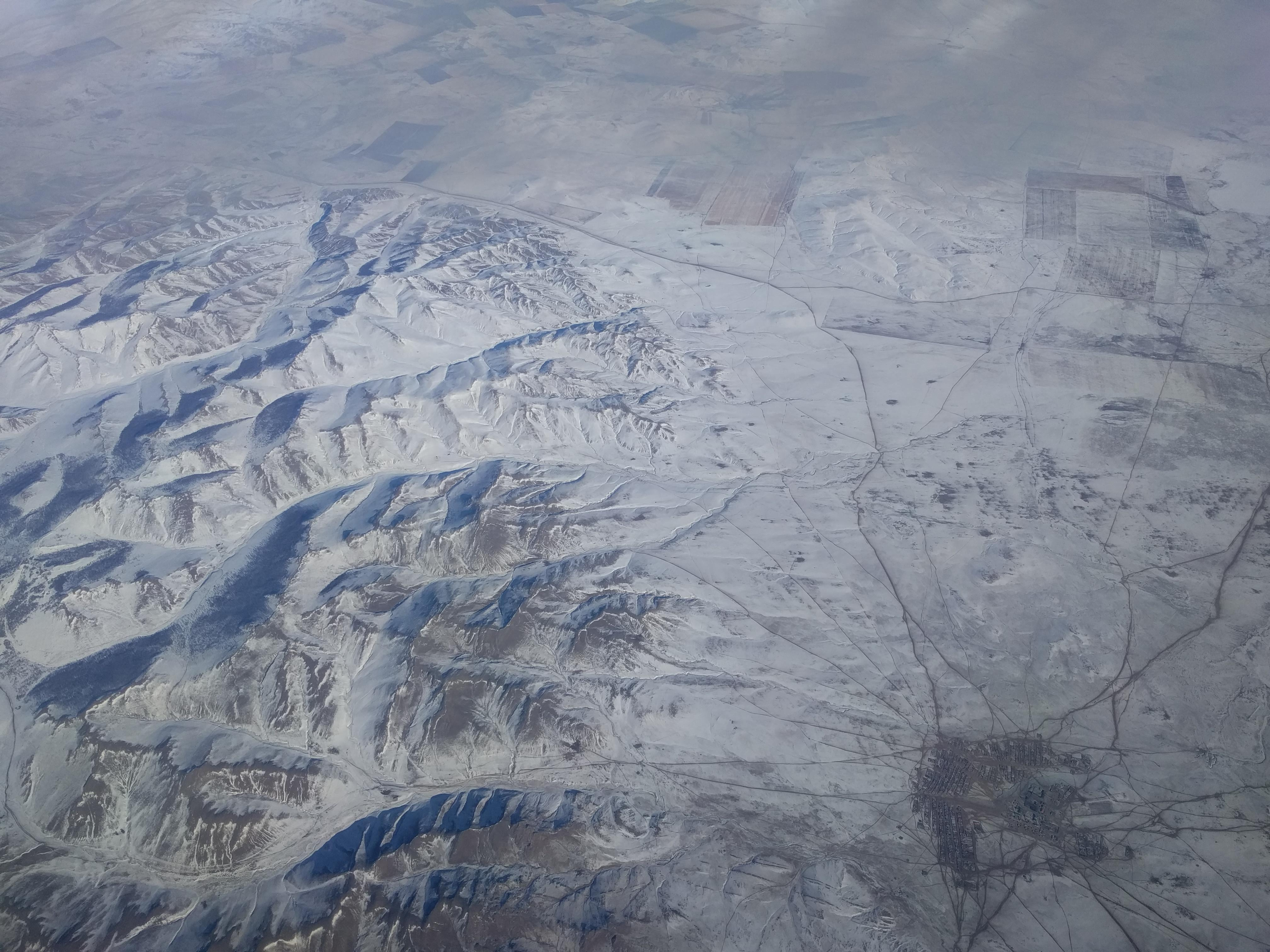
Zaamar from above

Zaamar (Mongolian: Заамар) is a sum of Töv Province in Mongolia. With a total area of 2,900 square kilometers, a population of 37,500, and 7,500 households, it is one of the largest areas in Mongolia.

== Geography ==
Zaamar has a total area of 2,803 square kilometers.

== Administrative divisions ==
The district is divided into four bags, which are:

- Khailaast
- Toson
- Tumstei
- Tuv
