= Jimi system =

System of stratified government in imperial China

Jimi system

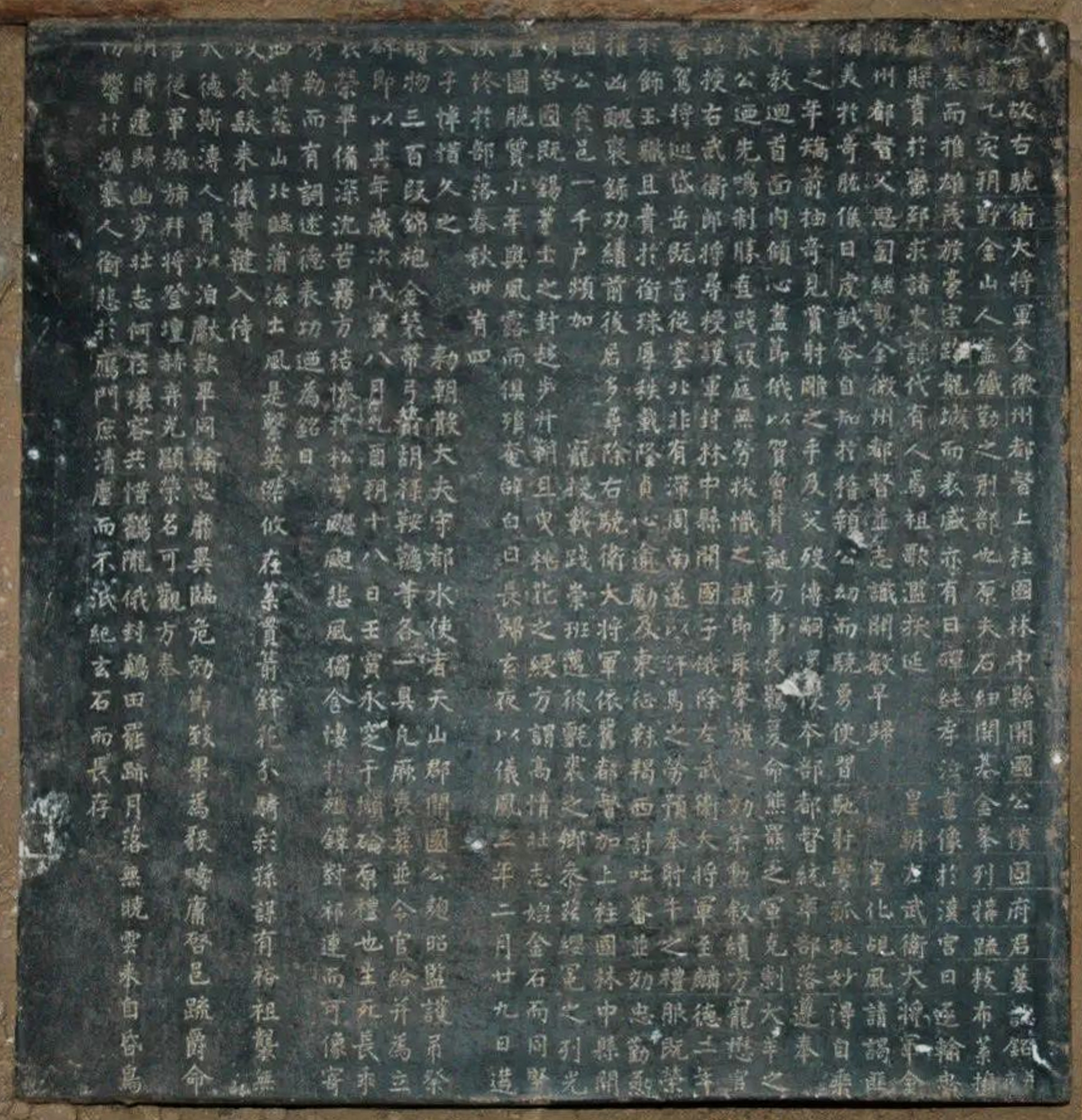
Epitaph of Pugu Yitu, a Turkic chief and vassal of the Tang dynasty under the Jimi system, who died in 678 CE.

The Jimi system (Chinese: 羈縻制) or Jimifuzhou (Chinese: 羈縻府州) was an autonomous administrative and political organization system used in China between the 7th century and 10th century. It should not be confused with the Chinese tributary system. The term "Jimi" was first seen in the annotation of Shiji quoted by Sima Zhen from a book of the Eastern Han dynasty, which implied to a man directing a horse or ox by the use of rein. Jimi administrative divisions were used primarily during the Tang dynasty from the 650s until the 740s. It was subsequently used in the Song, Yuan, Ming, and Qing dynasties under other names such as the Tusi system (Chinese: 土司制) until around 1726, when a new civil order under the Qing government was established.

== Characteristics ==
The system was a model of Chinese administrative units established for foreign rulers or chiefs that were either militarily subdued or self-subdued and naturalized. They received their duty from the central authority while keeping their original status, and passed on their duty to heirs. They were to provide annual tribute, following the foreign policy of the central authority and under its supervision. In foreign policy, they would collaborate with the officials sent by the central authority in administration, participate in military affairs guided by the central authority's interest, and obey the assignations made by the central authority. The system was first introduced by commander Li Daliang between August 23 and September 25, 630.

It mainly consisted of three levels: the command area (Chinese: 都督府), prefecture (Chinese: 州) and county (Chinese: 縣). Known collectively as Jimifuzhou or the loose-control administrative units, they were not commonly confused with Zhengzhou (Chinese: 正州) or the regular administrative units. In additions, there were also two loose-control protectorates (duhufu 都護府) established in the former Western Turkic Khaganate around the Tarbagatai Mountains and Lake Balkhash in 658, the only loose-control protectorates ever established. In some cases, a moderate number of loose-control counties were also established under the jurisdiction of a regular prefecture at the border of Tang proper. The loose-control administrative units, specifically the command area and prefecture, were established shortly after a region, state or tribe was subdued and formed as a political division within the extent of a separated regular protectorate.

They were established in the areas of today's northern Hebei, northern Shaanxi, Gansu, Ningxia, Inner Mongolia, Outer Mongolia, Siberia, Sogdiana and Afghanistan to the north and west, Hunan and Guangxi to the south, western Sichuan, Guizhou and Yunnan to the southwest, where they co-existed with the regular prefecture, and also parts of Inner and Central Asia during the early Tang empire. Until 755, there were approximately 1,000 or around 856 loose-control prefectures established within the former khaganate and state, about 2.6 times the regular prefecture.

== See also ==
- Fanzhen
- Fengjian
- Jiedushi
- Tusi
