= Kutluğ =

- Gender: Masculine
- Language: Turkish

Origin
- Language: Turkish
- Origin: kut
- Derivation: "kut" + "luğ"
- Meaning: "holy", "hooly", "blessed"

Other names
- Cognates: Kutlu, Kutlug
- See also: Kutalmış, Kutlu, Aykut, Orkut

Kutluğ is a common masculine Turkish given name. In Turkish, "Kutluğ" means "holy" or "blessed".

== Given name ==
- Aşina Kutluğ, the founder of the Second Eastern Turkic Khaganate.
- Kutlug Yabghu Qaghan, a ruler of the Second Eastern Turkic Khaganate.
- Kutluğ Ataman, a Turkish filmmaker and contemporary artist.
- Kutlug I Bilge Khagan, a founder of Uyghur Khaganate (744 CE)
- Qutlugh Khwaja
- Qutlugh bin Tur Ali
