= Aytek =

- Gender: Masculine
- Language: Turkish

Origin
- Language: Turkish (Old Turkic)
- Meaning: 1. "Like the Moon"; 2. "Unique and/or bright like the Moon"
- Region of origin: Central Asia

Other names
- See also: Ayberk, Aydın, Ayhan, Aykut

Aytek is a Turkish masculine given name. The name is composed by one word and a suffix: Ay and -tek. In Turkish, "Ay" means Moon, and the suffix, "-tek" originally comes from Old Turkic suffix "-teg", which gives the meaning of "-like". The meaning of the name therefore is "like the Moon" or "Moonlike", or particularly "unique and/or bright like the Moon".

== Given name ==
- Aytek Genc, former Australian-Turkish footballer and coach
- Aytek Aşıkoğlu, Turkish footballer who plays for Çaykur Rizespor
- Aytek Gürkan, former Turkish basketballer and administrator
