= Ayberk =

- Gender: Male

Origin
- Language: Turkish
- Meaning: "Lightning like brightness of the moon"

Other names
- Related names: Aydın, Ayhan, Aykut, Aytek

Ayberk is a common masculine Turkish given name. It is composed of "Ay" and "Berk". In Turkish, "Ay" means "moon", while "Berk" means "lightning", "strong", or "rugged". Therefore, "Ayberk" means "Lightning like brightness of the moon". It can also mean "high moon".

== Sportspeople ==
- Ayberk Sevinç, Turkish volleyball player who currently plays Fenerbahçe Men's Volleyball
- Mehmet Ayberk Koşak (born 2001), Turkish artistic gymnast
- Ayberk Karapo (born 2004), Turkish footballer

== Others ==
- Ayberk Köprülü, TV host and producer
