= Kutalmış =

- Gender: Masculine
- Language: Turkish

Origin
- Language: Turkish
- Origin: kut
- Derivation: 1. "kut" 2. "almış"
- Meaning: 1. "life force", "happiness" 2. "[he/she] received", "[he/she] took"

Other names
- Anglicisations: Qutulmush, Kutalmysh, Kutalmish
- See also: Kutlu, Kutluğ, Aykut, Orkut

Kutalmış is a very rare masculine Turkish given name. "Kutalmış" is composed of two words: "kut" and "almış". In Turkish, "Kut" means "life force", and/or "happiness" whereas "almış" means literally "(he/she) received", and/or "(he/she) took". Thus, "Kutalmış" means "who received happiness (divine)", ""who received life force (from god)". In Turkish mythology, "Kut" also means "divine authority or power that a person (kağan) has received (blessed) from god". In this interpretation, "Kutalmış" means, "The ruler who is blessed and authorized by god to be the ruler".

== Given name ==
- Seljuk Kutalmısh, the son of Arslan Yabgu and a cousin of Toğrül Bey (Toghrul Begh).
- Ahmet Kutalmış Türkeş, the son of Alparslan Türkeş and MP of Justice and Development Party.
