= Orhan (disambiguation) =

Orhan was the second sultan of the Ottoman Empire from 1323/4 to 1362.

Orhan also may refer to:

== People ==
- Orhan (name), people with the name and surname

== Places ==
- Orhan, İzmit, a neighborhood in İzmit district of Kocaeli, Turkey
