= First Turkic Khaganate =

552–603 khaganate founded by the Göktürks

- 552–603
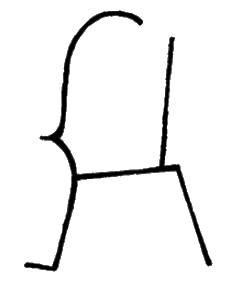
- Tamga of Ashina tribe

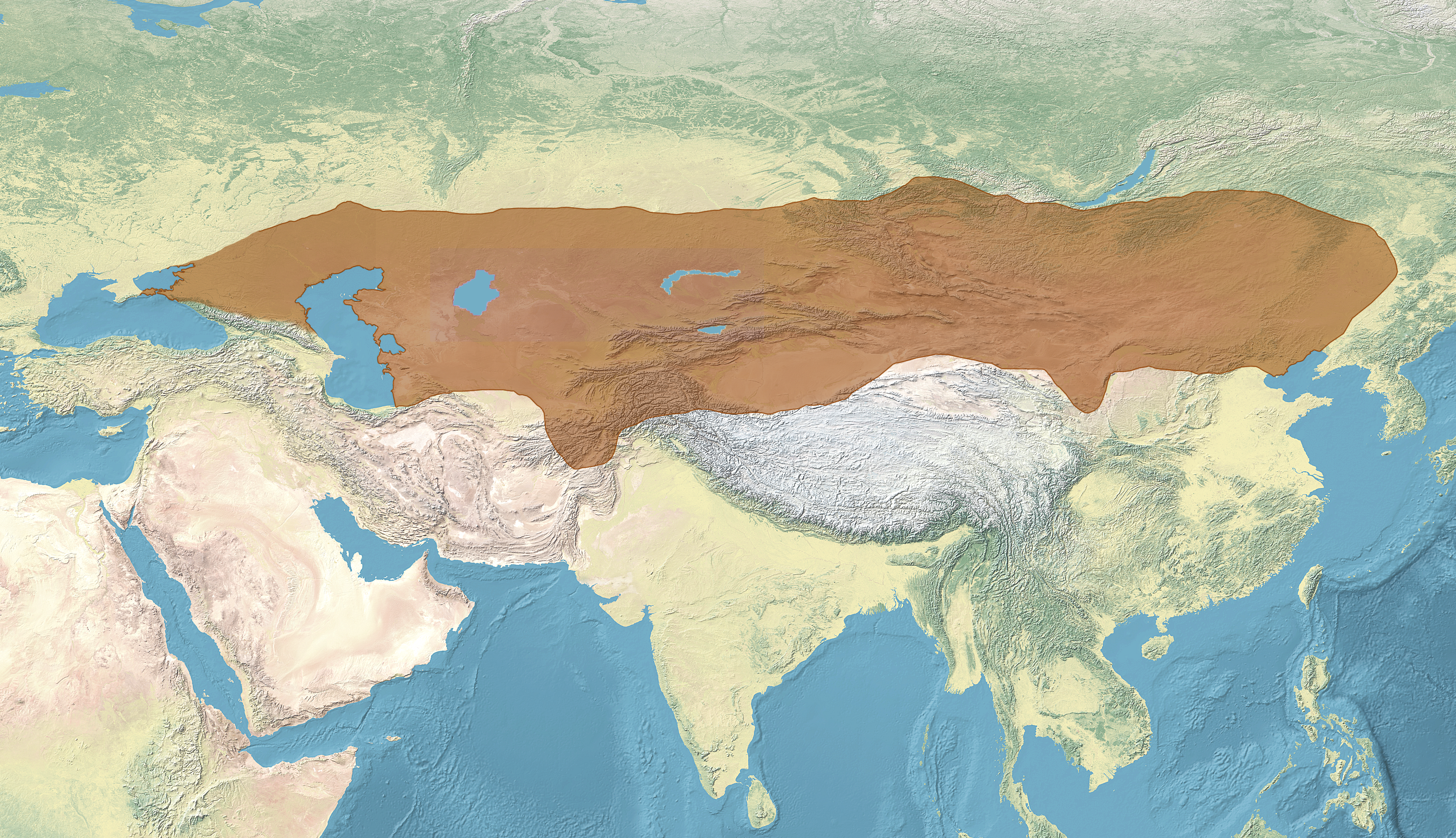
- Status: Khaganate (Nomadic empire)
- Capital: Ötüken (eastern); Suyab (western)
- Common languages: Old Turkic (official, dynastic and common); Sogdian (official, diplomacy, coinage); Rouran (official)
- Religion: Tengrism, Buddhism
- Demonyms: Türük; Türk
- Qaghan
  - 552: Bumin Qaghan (first)
  - 599–603: Tardu (last)
- Yabgu
  - 552–575: Istämi (first)
  - 575–599: Tardu (last)
- Historical era: Post-classical
  - Bumin Qaghan revolts against Rouran Khaganate: 542
  - Established: 552
  - Göktürk civil war: 581
  - Brief re-unification: 603
  - Division of Western and Eastern Turkic Khaganates: 603

Area
- 557: 6,000,000 km^{2} (2,300,000 sq mi)

Population
  - 6th century: 3 million
Preceded by	Succeeded by
Rouran Khaganate; Hephthalite Empire	Eastern Turkic Khaganate; Western Turkic Khaganate

The First Turkic Khaganate, also referred to as the First Turkic Empire, the Turkic Khaganate or the Göktürk Khaganate, was a Turkic khaganate established by the Ashina clan of the Göktürks in medieval Inner Asia under the leadership of Bumin Qaghan (d. 552) and his brother Istämi. The First Turkic Khaganate succeeded the Rouran Khaganate as the hegemonic power of the Mongolian Plateau and rapidly expanded their territories in Central Asia. The khaganate became the first Central Asian transcontinental empire from Manchuria to the Black Sea.

Although the Göktürks spoke a Siberian Turkic language, the direct predecessor to the Orkhon Turkic of the Second Turkic Khaganate, the First Khaganate's early official texts and coins were written in Sogdian. It was the first Turkic state to use the name Türk politically. The Old Turkic script was invented in the first half of the sixth century.

The Khaganate collapsed in 603, after a series of conflicts and civil wars which separated the polity into the Eastern Turkic Khaganate and Western Turkic Khaganate. Tang China conquered the Eastern Turkic Khaganate in 630 and the Western Turkic Khaganate in 657 in a series of military campaigns. The Second Turkic Khaganate emerged in 682 and lasted until 744, when it was overthrown by the Uyghur Khaganate.

== History ==
=== Origin ===
The origins of the Turkic Khaganate trace back to 546, when Bumin Qaghan made a preemptive strike against the Uyghur and Tiele groups planning a revolt against their overlords, the Rouran Khaganate. For this service, he expected to be rewarded with a Rouran princess, thus marrying into the royal family. However, the Rouran khagan, Yujiulü Anagui, sent an emissary to Bumin to rebuke him, saying, "You are my blacksmith slave. How dare you utter these words?" As Anagui's "blacksmith slave" (Chinese: 鍛奴; pinyin: duànnú) comment was recorded in Chinese chronicles, some claim that the Göktürks were indeed blacksmith servants for the Rouran elite, and that "blacksmith slavery" may have indicated a form of vassalage within Rouran society. According to Denis Sinor, this reference indicates that the Turks specialized in metallurgy, although it is unclear if they were miners or blacksmiths. Whatever the case, it was clearly indicated that the Turks were "slaves" that were not be taken literally, but rather a form of vassalage, or an unequal alliance.

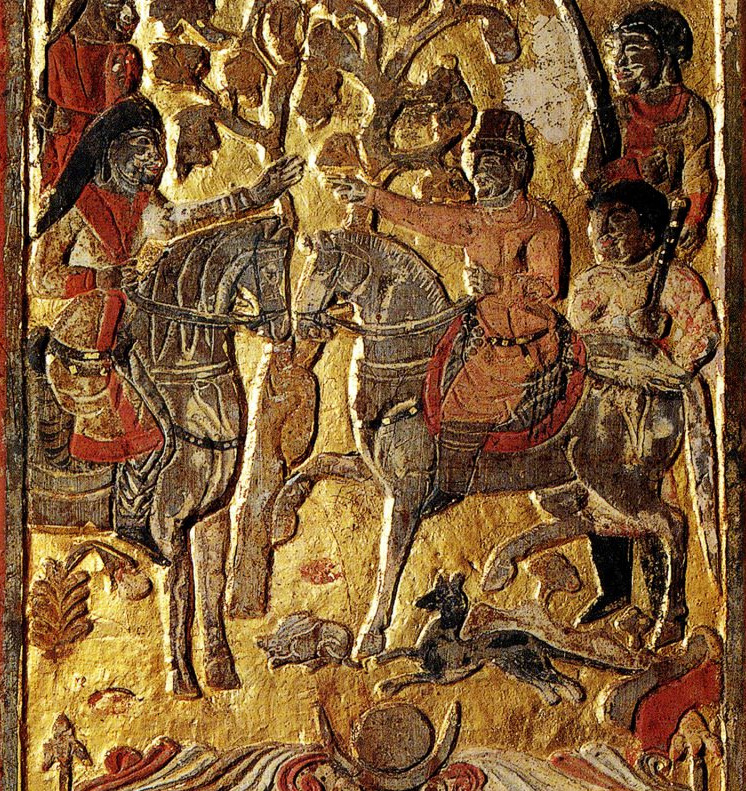
Panel from the Tomb of Anjia, a Sogdian trader (right), who is shown welcoming a Turkic leader (left, with long hair combed in the back). 579 CE, Xi'an, China.

A disappointed Bumin allied with the Western Wei against the Rouran, their common enemy, by marrying Princess Changle. In 552, Bumin defeated Anagui and his forces north of Huaihuang (modern Zhangjiakou, Hebei).

This effectively ended the Rouran, which had for the previous century and a half been the dominant power on the eastern steppe.

=== Western expansion ===
Having excelled both in battle and diplomacy, Bumin declared himself Illig Khagan of the new Khaganate at Ötüken, but died only months later. He was succeeded by his son Qara who also died shortly. The newly established empire was then divided among Bumin's other son, Muqan Qaghan and his brother Istämi.

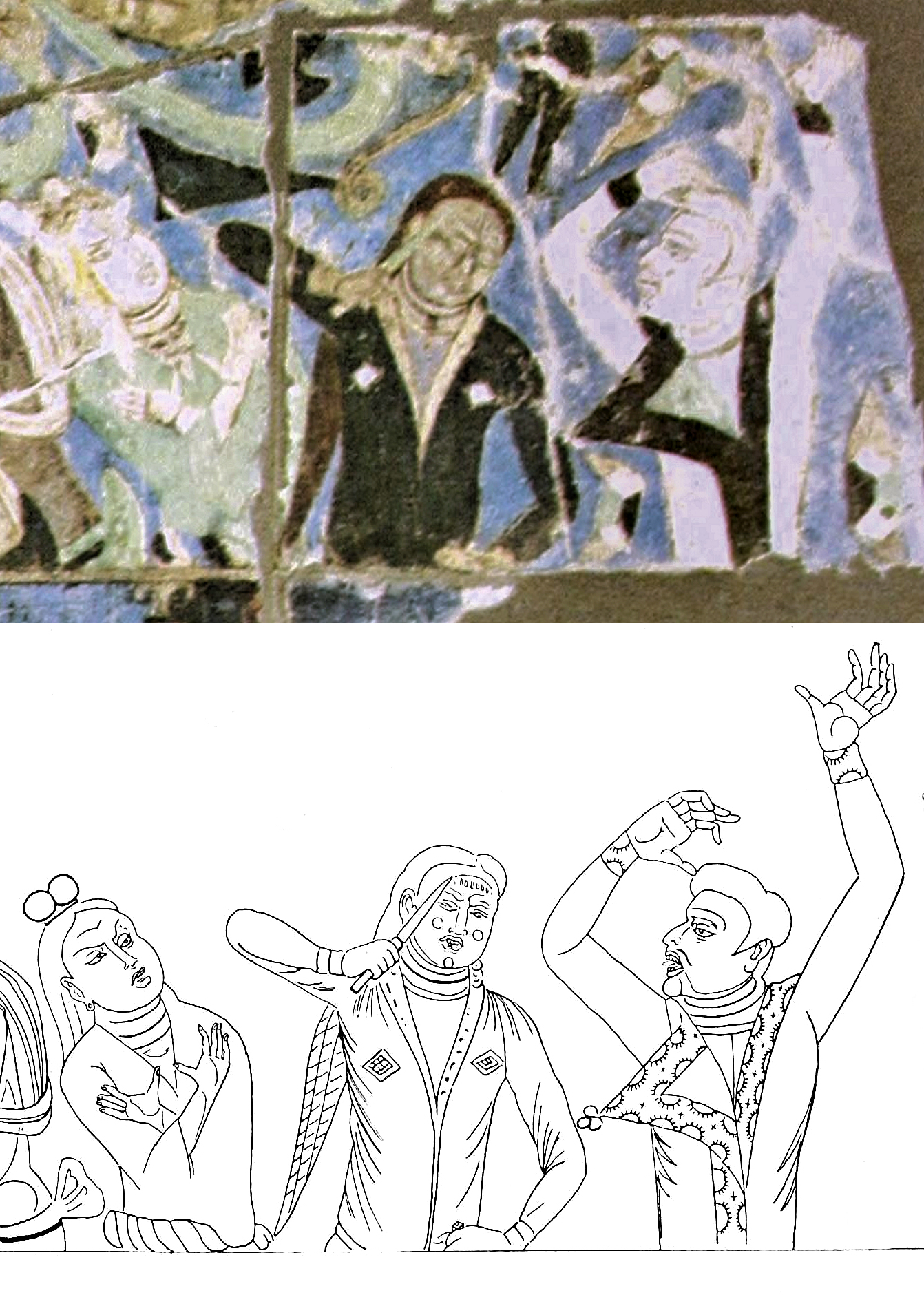
A Turk mourning the Buddha, Kyzyl, Mingoi, Maya cave 224, 550-600 CE.

Muqan ruled over the eastern part of the empire centered on Mongolia and defeated the Hephthalite Empire. Bumin's brother Istämi (d. 576) bore the title "Yabghu of the West". This western branch of the Ashina clan was de facto independent while the eastern khagan was formally recognized as the senior. In 557, Istämi forged an alliance with Khosrow I of the Sassanid Empire of Iran to defeat and destroy the Hephthalites, who were allies of the Rouran. This resulted in the establishment of a common border between the two empires. This war tightened the Ashina clan's grip on the Silk Road. The alliance with Northern China was further reinforced in 568 through the marriage of the Turkic princess Ashina, daughter of Muqan Qaghan, with Emperor Wu of the Xianbei-led Chinese Northern Zhou dynasty.

The appearance of the Pannonian Avars in the West has been interpreted as a nomadic faction fleeing the westward expansion of the Göktürks, although the specifics are a matter of debate given the lack of clear sources and chronology. Rene Grousset links the Avars with the downfall of the Hephthalites rather than the Rouran, while Denis Sinor argues that Rouran-Avar identification is "repeated from article to article, from book to book with no shred of evidence to support it".

Istämi's policy of western expansion brought the Göktürks into Europe. In 576 the Göktürks crossed the Kerch Strait into the Crimea. Five years later they laid siege to Chersonesus; their cavalry kept roaming the steppes of Crimea until 590. As for the southern borders, they were drawn south of the Amu Darya, bringing the Ashina into conflict with their former allies, the Sasanian Empire. In 589, the Sasanian Empire attacked and defeated the Türks. Much of Bactria (including Balkh) remained a dependency of the Ashina until the end of the century.

=== Relations with the Byzantine Empire ===
The Göktürks played a major role in the Byzantine Empire's relationship with the Persian Sasanian Empire. First contact with the Byzantines is believed to have happened in 563 and relates to an incident in 558 where the slaves of the Turks (the Pannonian Avars) ran away during their war with the Hephthalites.

The second contact occurred when Maniah, a Sogdian diplomat, convinced Istämi (also known as Silziboulos in Greek writings) of the Göktürks to send an embassy directly to the Byzantine Empire's capital Constantinople, which arrived in 568 and offered silk as a gift to emperor Justin II and where they discussed an alliance. Justin II seems to have been more interested in securing an ally to the rear of the Sasanians with whom they had been in almost permanent conflict rather than the importation of silk. In 569 an embassy led by Zemarchus occurred which was well received and likely solidified their alliance for war.

Another set of embassies occurred in 575–576 led by Valentine which were received with hostility by Turxanthos due to alleged treachery. They required the members of the Byzantine delegation at the funeral of Istämi to lacerate their faces to humiliate them. The subsequent hostility shown by the new ruler Tardu would be matched in Byzantine writings. With the insults reflecting a breakdown of the alliance, the likely cause is that the anger was due to the Turks not having their expectations met from their agreements and realising they were being used when they no longer aligned with the current goals of the Byzantine Empire (who correspondingly did not trust the Turks as partners).

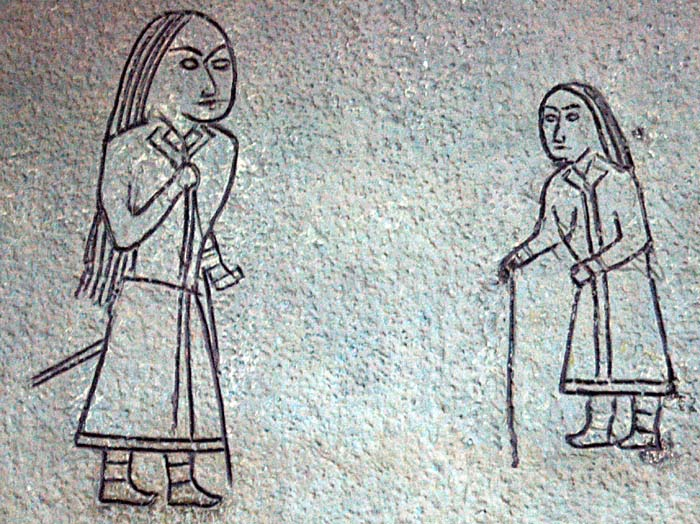
Göktürk petroglyphs from Mongolia (6th to 8th century).

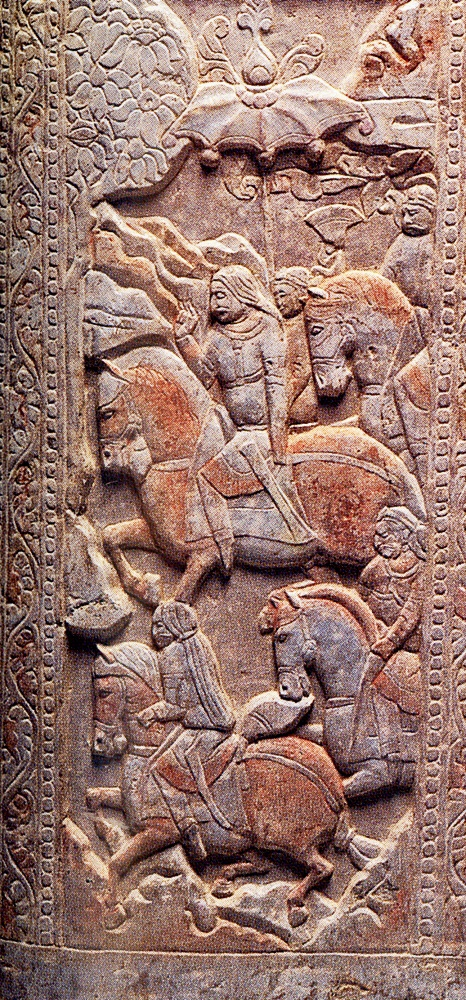
Turkic horsemen with long hair on the tomb of a Sogdian trader, the Miho funerary couch. Circa 570 CE. Northern Dynasties, China.

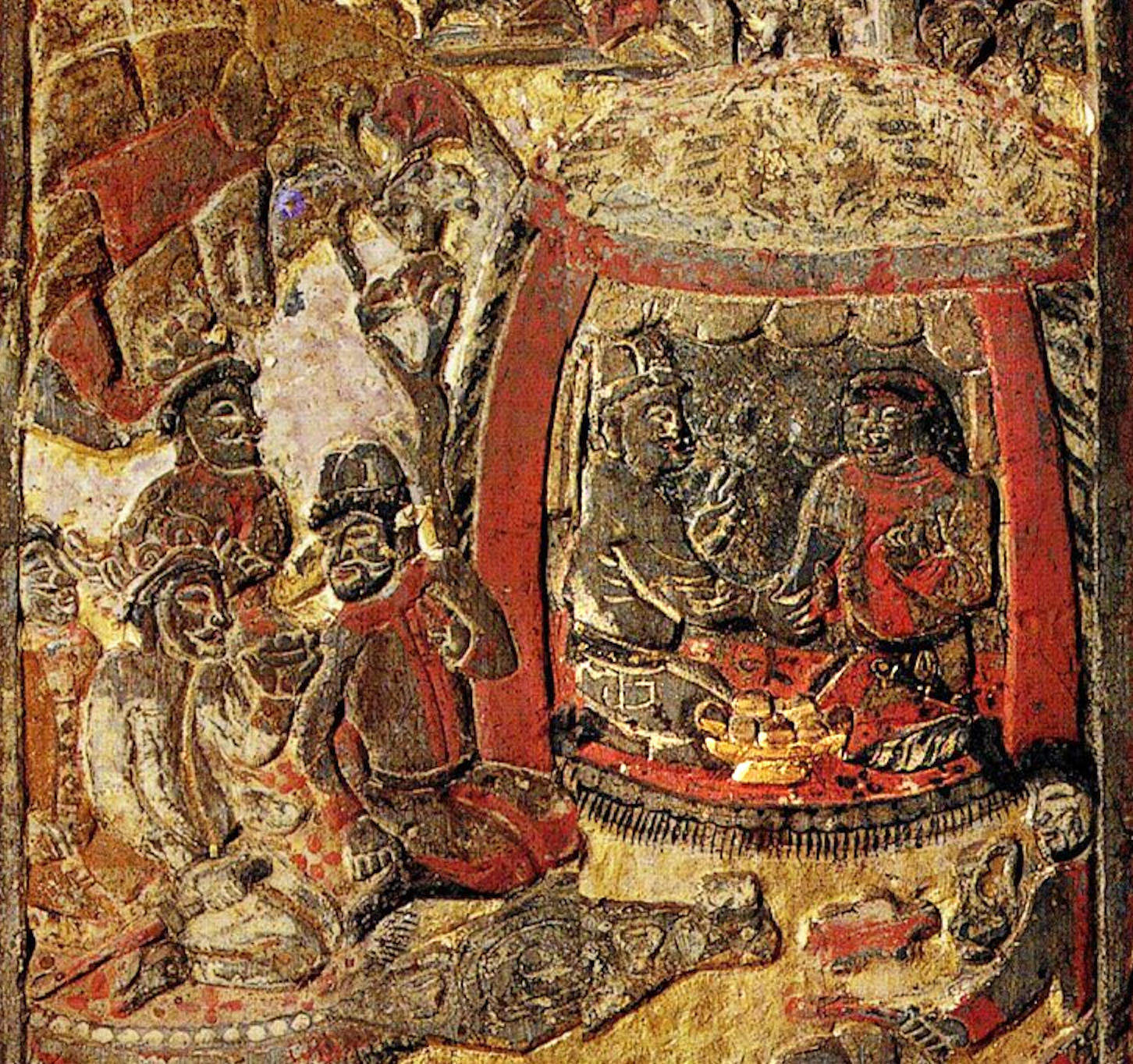
In a Turkic yurt, the Sogdian trader An Jia (left) with a Turkic Chieftain (right). 579 CE, Tomb of An Jia, Xi’an, China.

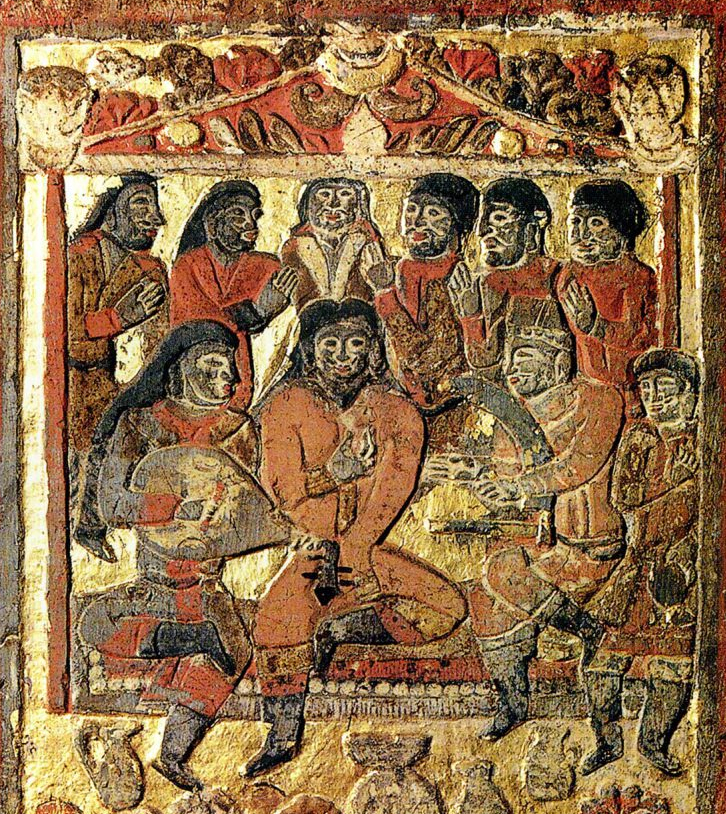
Reception of a noble Turk (center, with his retinue to the left) in the residence of the Sogdian trader An Jia (right half). 579 CE, Tomb of An Jia, Xi’an, China.

=== Civil war ===
Göktürk civil war

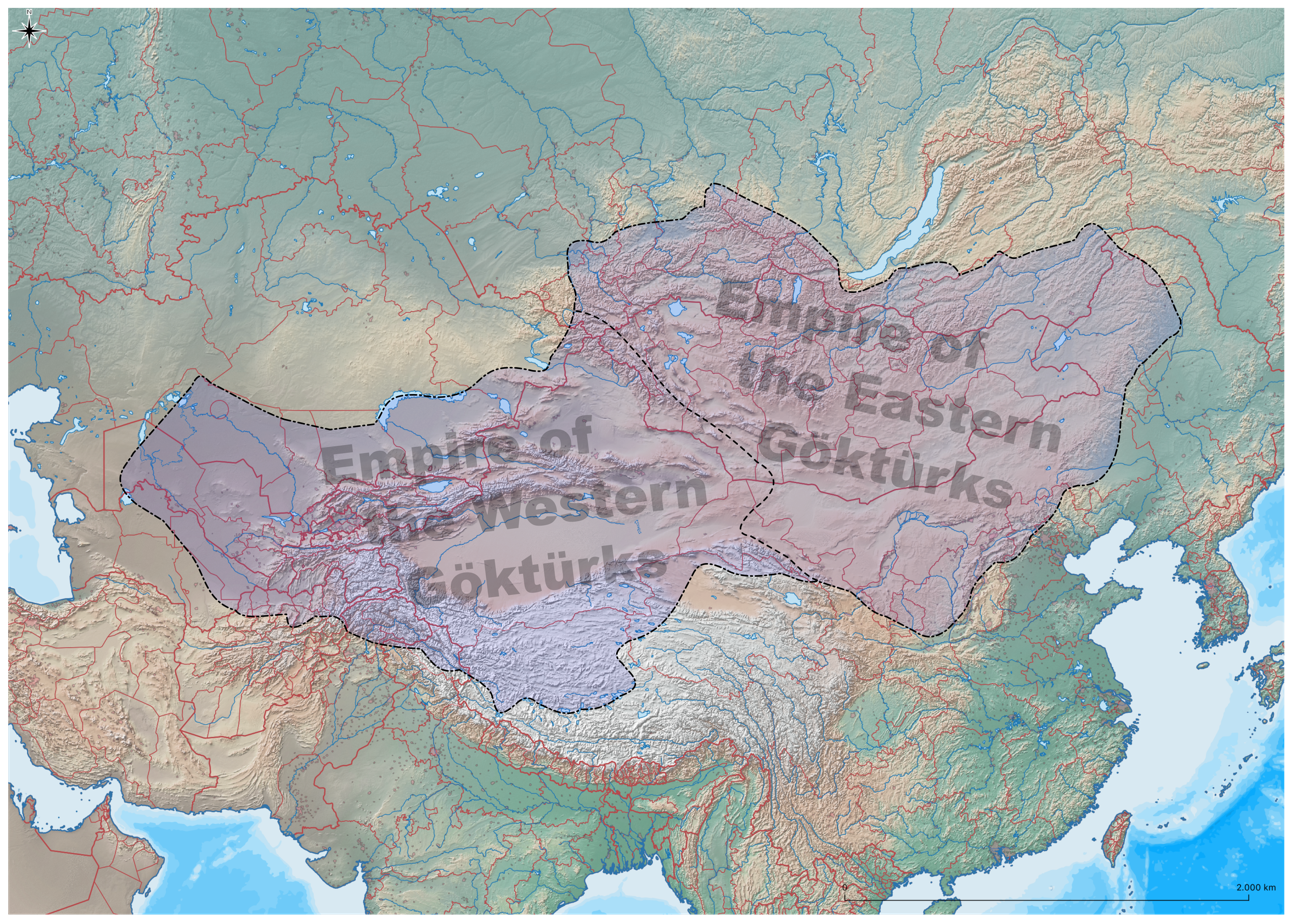
The khaganate in 552 after its division into Western Turkic Khaganate and Eastern Turkic Khaganate

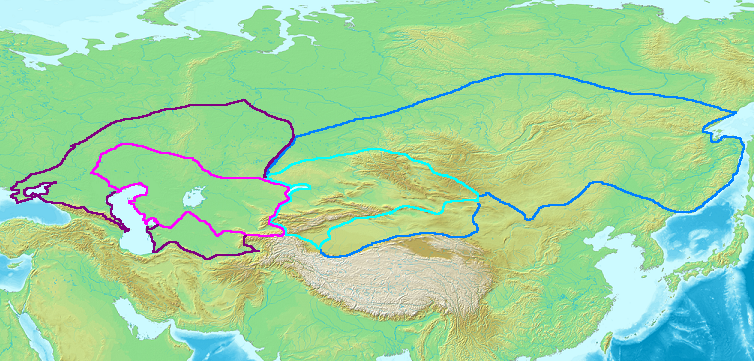
Gokturk khaganates at their height, c. 600 AD:
Western Gokturk: Lighter area is direct rule, darker areas show sphere of influence.
Eastern Gokturk: Lighter area is direct rule, darker areas show sphere of influence.

When the fourth ruler of the khaganate, Taspar Qaghan, died in 581, the realm split in two over his succession. He had willed the title of khagan to Muqan's son Apa Qaghan, but the high council appointed Ishbara Qaghan instead. Factions formed around both leaders. Before long, four rivals claimed the title. They were successfully played off against each other by the Sui and Tang dynasties.

Istämi's son, Tardu the leader of the western Turks, made a bid for total independence. He seized the title and led an army east to claim the seat of imperial power, Ötüken.

In order to support his position, Ishbara of the Eastern Khaganate, acknowledged the suzerainty of Emperor Yang of Sui in order to seek their protection. Tardu attacked Chang'an, the Sui capital, around 600, demanding Emperor Yangdi end his interference in the civil war. In retaliation, Sui diplomacy successfully incited a revolt of Tardu's Tiele vassals, which led to the end of Tardu's reign in 603. Among the dissident tribes were the Uyghurs and Xueyantuo.

==== Eastern Turkic Khaganate ====
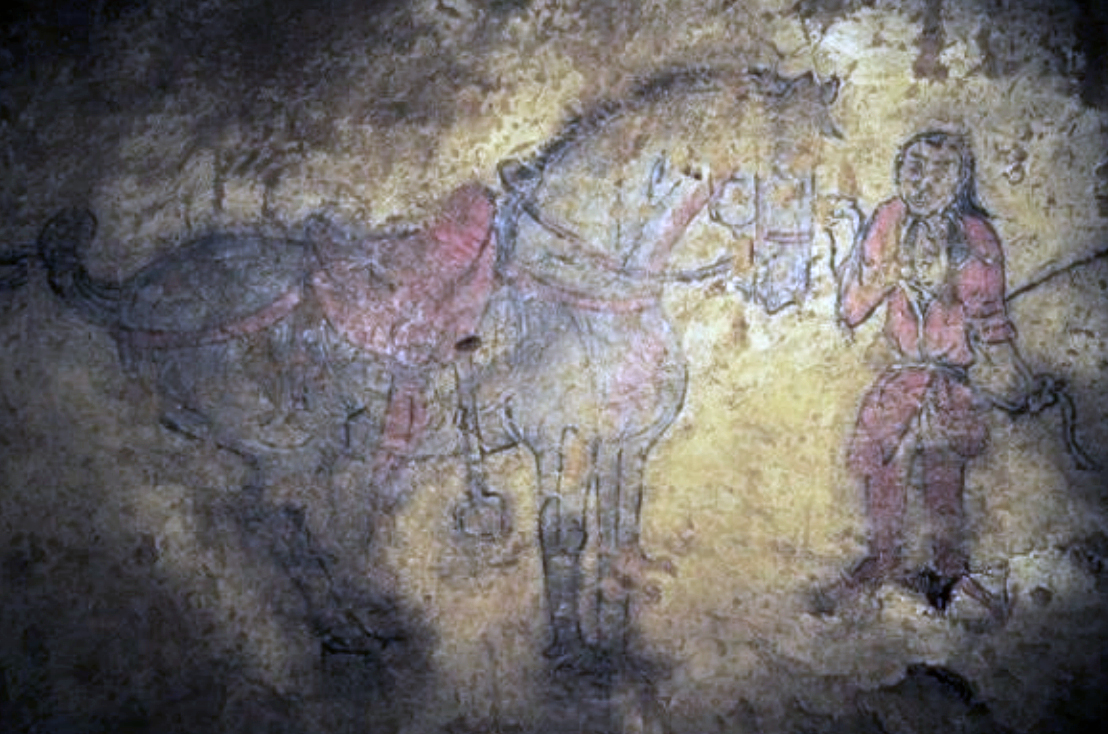
Shoroon Bumbagar tomb mural, Göktürk, 7th century CE, Mongolia.

The civil war left the empire divided into eastern and western parts. The eastern part, still ruled from Ötüken, remained in the orbit of the Sui and retained the name Göktürk. Shibi Khan (609–619) and Illig Qaghan (620–630) attacked the Central Plain at its weakest moment during the transition between the Sui and Tang. Shibi Khan's surprise attack against Yanmen Commandery during an imperial tour of the northern frontier almost captured Emperor Yang, but his ethnic Han wife Princess Yicheng—who had been well treated by Empress Xiao during an earlier visit—sent a warning ahead, allowing the emperor and empress time to flee to the commandery seat at present-day Daixian in Shanxi. This was besieged by the Turkic army on September 11, 615, but Sui reinforcements and a false report from Princess Yicheng to her husband about a northern attack on the khaganate caused him to lift the siege before its completion.

In 626, Illig Qaghan took advantage of the Xuanwu Gate Incident and drove on to Chang'an. On September 23, 626, Illig Qaghan and his iron cavalry reached the bank of the Wei River north of Bian Bridge (in present-day Xianyang, Shaanxi). On September 25, 626, Emperor Taizong of Tang met Illig Qaghan on the border bridge, Taizong accused Illig Qaghan of crossing the border, Illig saw that Taizong was imposing and mistakenly thought that the reinforcements from the Tang dynasty had arrived, and was asked to duel. Illig was afraid and agreed to retreat in an alliance, which is called the Weishui Alliance (渭水之盟) or the Alliance of Bian Qiao (便橋會盟 / 便桥会盟). On the third day after the meeting, the Illig Qaghan sent 3,000 horses and 10,000 sheep to the border as compensation to the Tang dynasty, which Emperor Taizong did not accept, believing that this was too little. All in all, 67 incursions into China proper were recorded.

Before mid-October 627, heavy snows on the Mongolian–Manchurian grassland covered the ground to a depth of several feet, preventing the nomads' livestock from grazing and causing a massive die-off among the animals. According to the New Book of Tang, in 628, Taizong mentioned that "There has been a frost in midsummer. The sun had risen from same place for five days. The moon had had the same light level for three days. The field was filled with red atmosphere (dust storm)."

Illig Qaghan was brought down by a revolt of his Tiele vassal tribes (626–630), allied with Emperor Taizong of Tang. This tribal alliance figures in Chinese records as the Huihe (Uyghur).

On March 27, 630, a Tang army under the command of Li Jing defeated the Eastern Turkic Khaganate under the command of Illig Qaghan at the Battle of Yinshan (陰山之戰 / 阴山之战). Illig Qaghan fled to Ishbara Shad, but on May 2, 630 Zhang Baoxiang's army advanced to Ishbara Shad's headquarters. Illig Qaghan was taken prisoner and sent to Chang'an. The Eastern Turkic Khaganate collapsed and was incorporated into the Jimi system of the Tang. Emperor Taizong said, "It's enough for me to compensate my dishonor at Wei River."

==== Western Turkic Khaganate ====
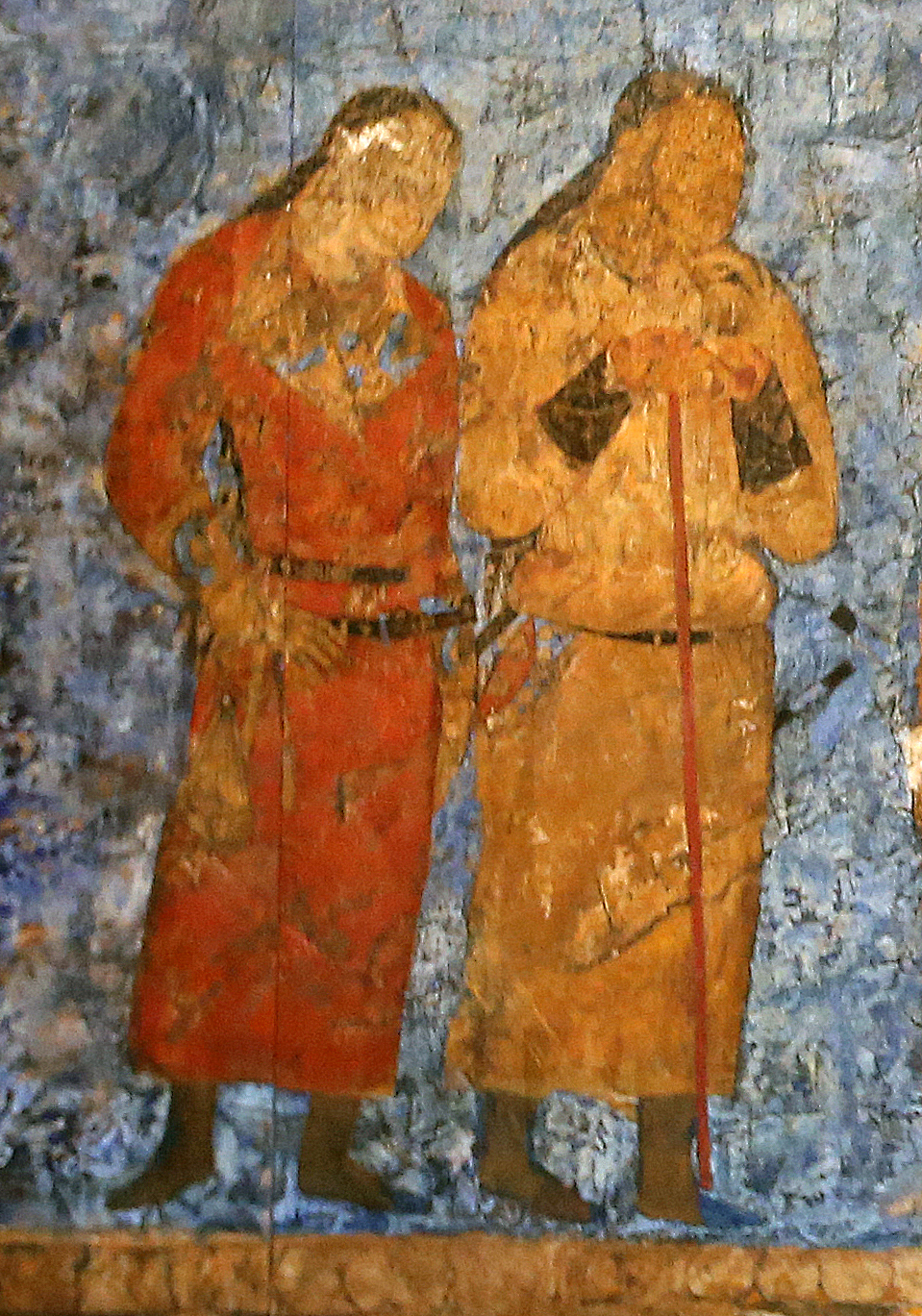
Western Turkic officers during an audience with king Varkhuman of Samarkand. 648–651, Afrasiyab murals, Samarkand.

The Western khagan Shikui Khagan and Tong Yabghu Qaghan made an alliance with the Byzantine Empire against the Sasanian Empire and defeated the Sasanians in 628, successfully restoring the southern borders along the Tarim and Amu Darya rivers. Their capital was Suyab in the Chu River valley, about 6 km (3.7 mi) south east of modern Tokmok. In 627 Tung Yabghu, assisted by the Khazars and Emperor Heraclius, launched a massive invasion of Transcaucasia which culminated in the taking of Derbent and Tbilisi. In April 630 Tung's deputy Böri Shad sent the Göktürk cavalry to invade Armenia, where his general Chorpan Tarkhan succeeded in routing a large Persian force. Tung Yabghu's murder in 630 forced the Göktürks to evacuate Transcaucasia.

The Western Turkic Khaganate was modernized through an administrative reform of the Ashina clan (reigned 634–639) and came to be known as the Onoq. The name refers to the "ten arrows" that were granted by the Khagan to ten leaders (shads) of its two constituent tribal confederations, the Duolu (five churs) and Nushibi (five irkins), whose lands were divided by the Chui River. The division fostered the growth of separatist tendencies. Soon, chieftain Kubrat of the Dulo clan, whose relationship with the Duolu is possible but not proven, seceded from the khaganate. The Tang dynasty campaigned against the khaganate and its vassals, the oasis states of the Tarim Basin. The Tang campaign against Karakhoja in 640 led to the retreat of the Western Turks, who were defeated during the Tang campaigns against Karasahr in 644 and the Tang campaign against Kucha in 648, leading to the 657 conquest of the Western Turks by the Tang general Su Dingfang. Emperor Taizong of Tang was proclaimed Khagan of the Göktürks in 658.

=== Tang vassals ===
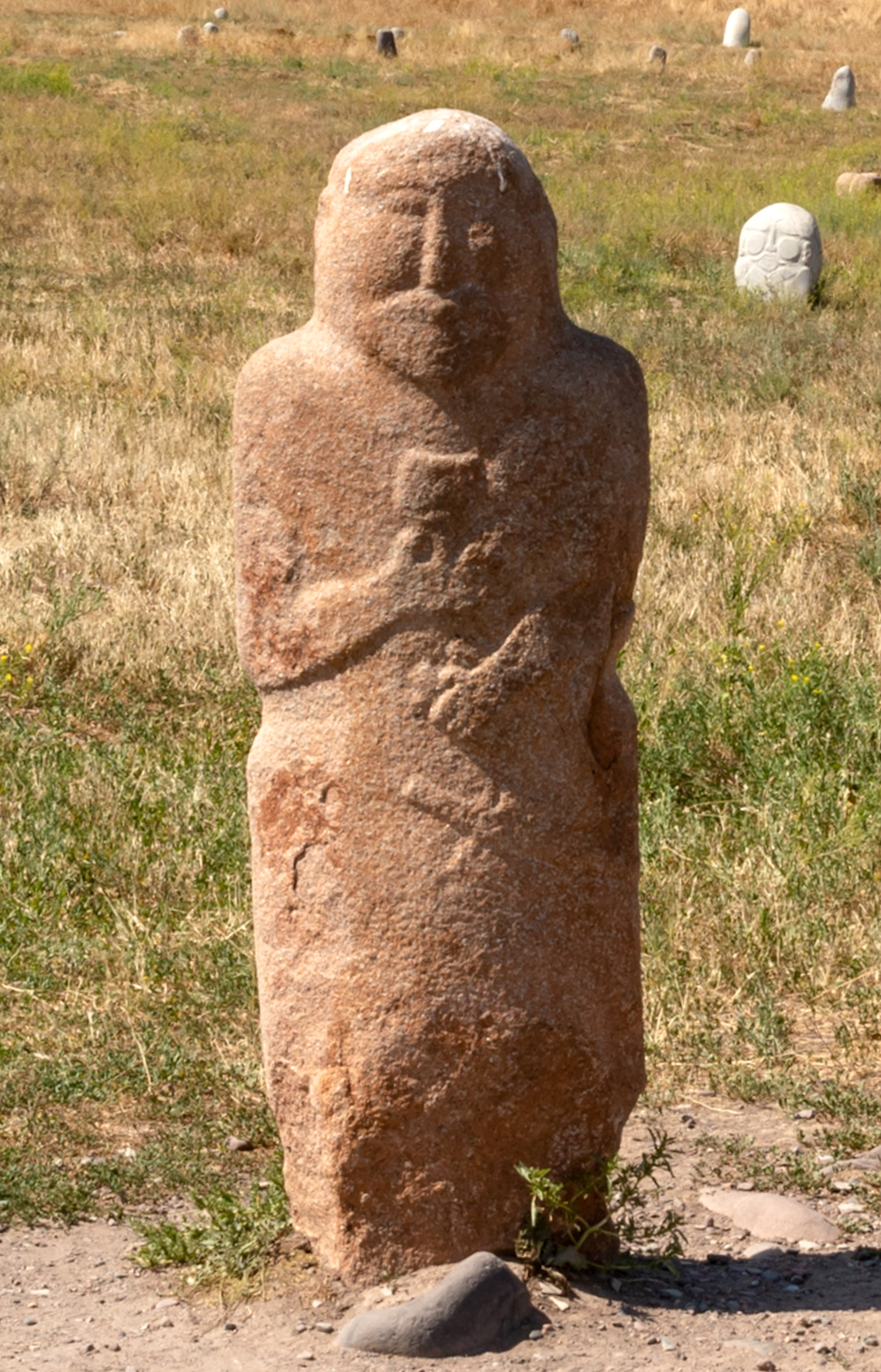
Turkic Balbal, Kyrgyzstan.

The Tang retained a member of the Ashina clan as a puppet khagan of the Türks. In 639, Ashina Jiesheshuai attempted to kill Emperor Taizong of Tang but failed, causing him to relocate the Türks. These khagans were not well respected among their peers and a new group of leaders known as the Turgesh were established by 699.

In 657, the Tang emperor could impose indirect rule along the Silk Road as far as modern-day Iran. He installed two khagans to rule the ten arrows (tribes) of Göktürks. The Five arrows of Tulu (咄陆) were ruled by khagans bearing the title of Xingxiwang (興昔亡可汗) while the Five Arrows of Nushipi (弩失畢可汗) were ruled by Jiwangjue (繼往絕可汗). The Five Tulu corresponded to the area east of Lake Balkash while the Five Arrows of Nushipi corresponded to the land east of the Aral Sea. The Göktürks now carried Chinese titles and fought by their side in their wars. The era spanning from 657 to 699 in the steppes was characterized by numerous rulers – weak, divided, and engaged in constant petty wars under the Anxi Protectorate until the rise of Turgesh.

The Second Turkic Khaganate was founded by Ilterish Qaghan after rebelling against the Tang in 681.

== Genetics ==
A genetic study published in Nature in May 2018 examined the remains of four elite Türk soldiers buried between ca. 300 AD and 700 AD. 50% of the samples of Y-DNA belonged to the West Eurasian haplogroup R1, while the other 50% belonged to East Eurasian haplogroups Q and O. The extracted samples of mtDNA belonged mainly to East Eurasian haplogroups C4b1, A14 and A15c, while one specimen carried the West Eurasian haplogroup H2a. The authors suggested that central Asian nomadic populations may have been Turkicized by an East Asian minority elite, resulting in a small but detectable increase in East Asian ancestry. However, these authors also found that Türkic period individuals were extremely genetically diverse, with some individuals being of complete West Eurasian descent. To explain this diversity of ancestry, they propose that there were also incoming West Eurasians moving eastward on the Eurasian steppe during the Türkic period, resulting in admixture.

The remains of a Türkic individual, analyzed in a 2021 study, were found to have carried the paternal haplogroup N-P89 (also known as N-F4205) and the maternal haplogroup F1b1b.

A 2020 study analyzed genetic data from 7 early medieval Türkic remains from Eastern Turkic Khaganate burial sites in Mongolia. The authors described the Türk samples as highly diverse, carrying on average 40% West Eurasian, and 60% East Eurasian ancestry. West Eurasian ancestry in the Türks combined Sarmatian-related and BMAC ancestry, while the East Eurasian ancestry was related to Ancient Northeast Asians. The authors also observed that the West Eurasian ancestry in these Türkic samples was largely inherited from male ancestors, which also corresponds with the marked increase of paternal haplogroups such as R and J during the Türkic period in Mongolia. Admixture between East and West Eurasian ancestors of the Türkic samples was dated to 500 CE, or roughly 8 generations prior. Two of the Türkic-affiliated males carried the paternal haplogroup J-M410, two carried haplogroup C-F3830, one carried haplogroup J-CTS5368, and one carried R1a-Z93. The maternal haplogroups were identified as D4 and D2, B4, C4, H1 and U7.

Regarding the Ashina tribe, the ruling clan of the Göktürks, a genetic sample belonging to Princess Ashina was found to be nearly entirely derived from Ancient Northeast Asians (96-98%) and also displayed affinity for the Slab-grave culture. According to the authors, these findings "once again validates a cultural diffusion model over a demic diffusion model for the spread of Turkic languages" and refutes "the western Eurasian origin and multiple origin hypotheses".

Two Türk remains (GD1-1 and GD2-4) excavated from present-day eastern Mongolia analysed in a 2024 paper, were found to display only little to no West Eurasian ancestry. One of the Türk remains (GD1-1) was derived entirely from an Ancient Northeast Asian source (represented by SlabGrave1 or Khovsgol_LBA and Xianbei_Mogushan_IA), while the other Türk remain (GD2-4) displayed an "admixed profile" deriving c. 48−50% ancestry from Ancient Northeast Asians, c. 47% ancestry from an ancestry maximised in Han Chinese (represented by Han_2000BP), and 3−5% ancestry from a West Eurasian source (represented by Sarmatians). The GD2-4 belonged to the paternal haplogroup D-M174. The authors argue that these findings are "providing a new piece of information on this understudied period".

== Gallery ==
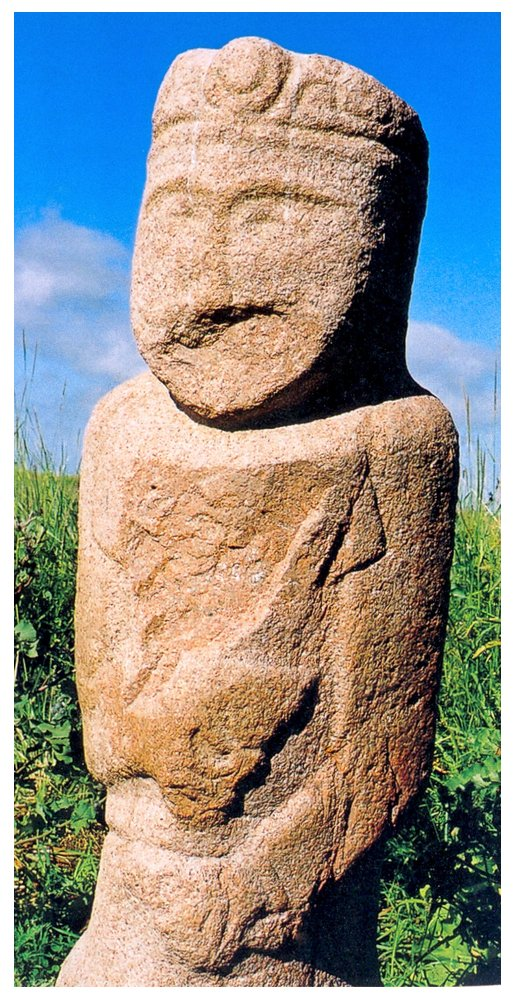
Statue of Niri Qaghan, Xinjiang, China.

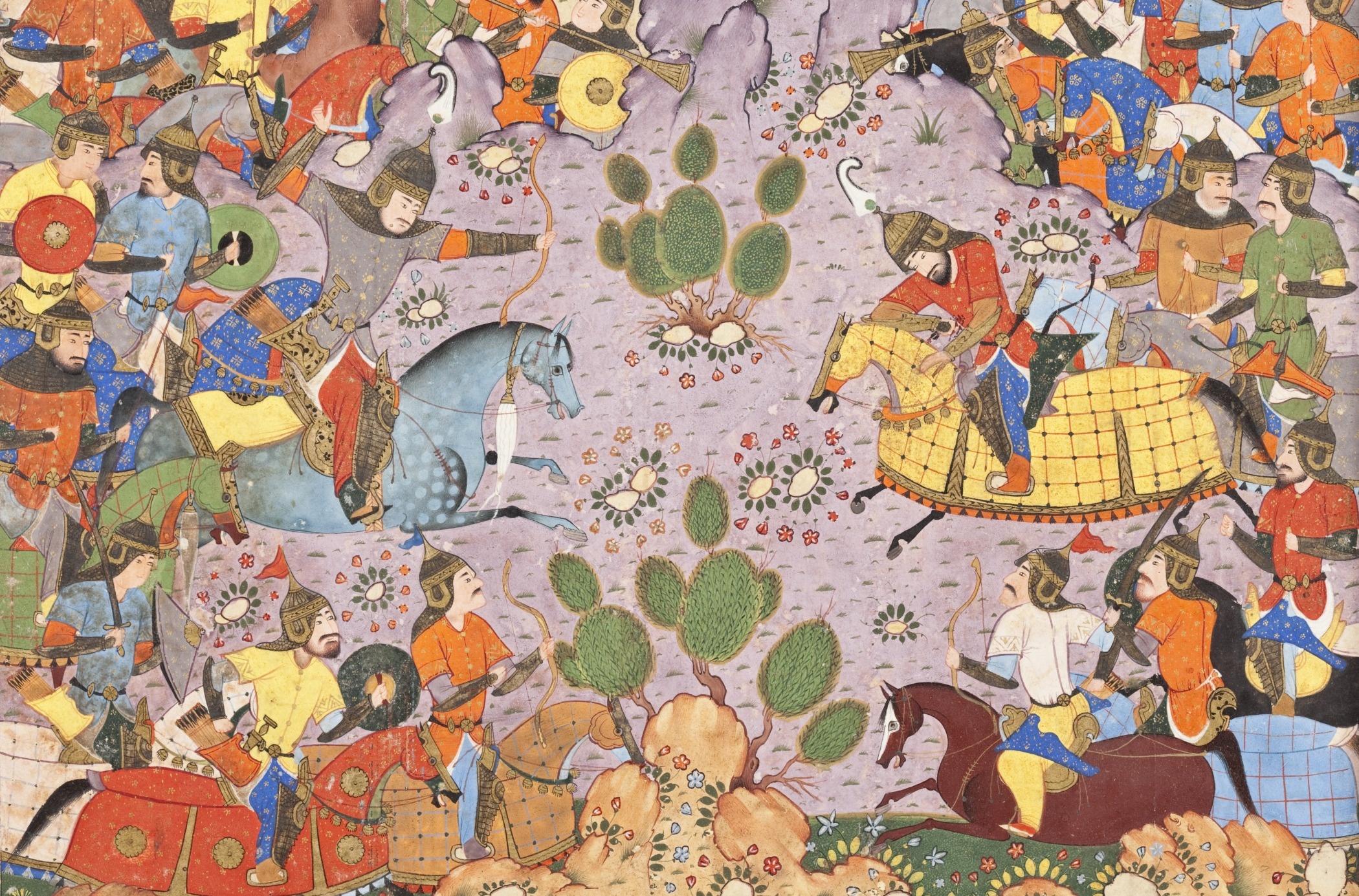
Shahnameh illustration of Bahram Chobin fighting Bagha Qaghan.

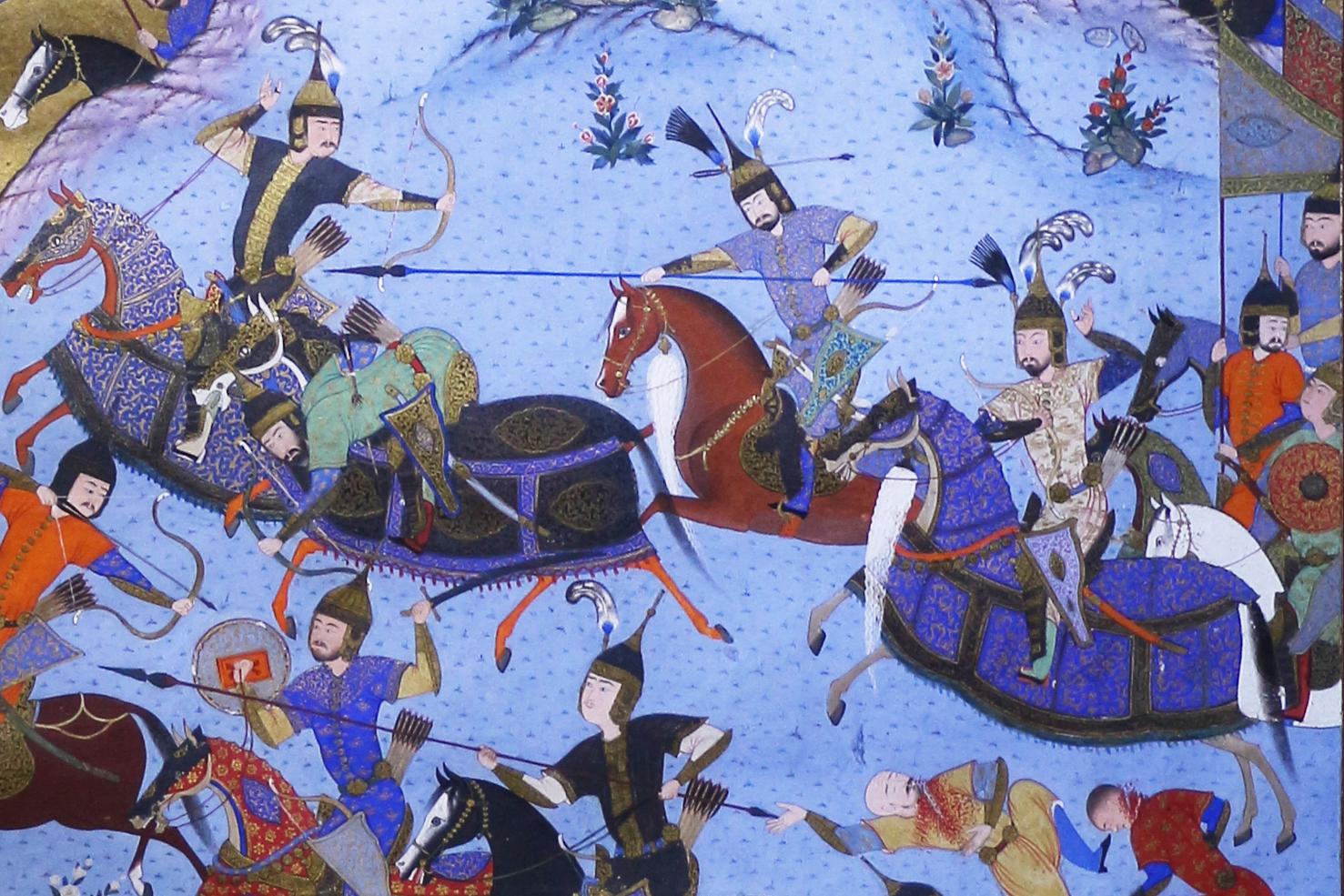
Shahnameh illustration of Bahram Chobin and Bagha Qaghan fighting.

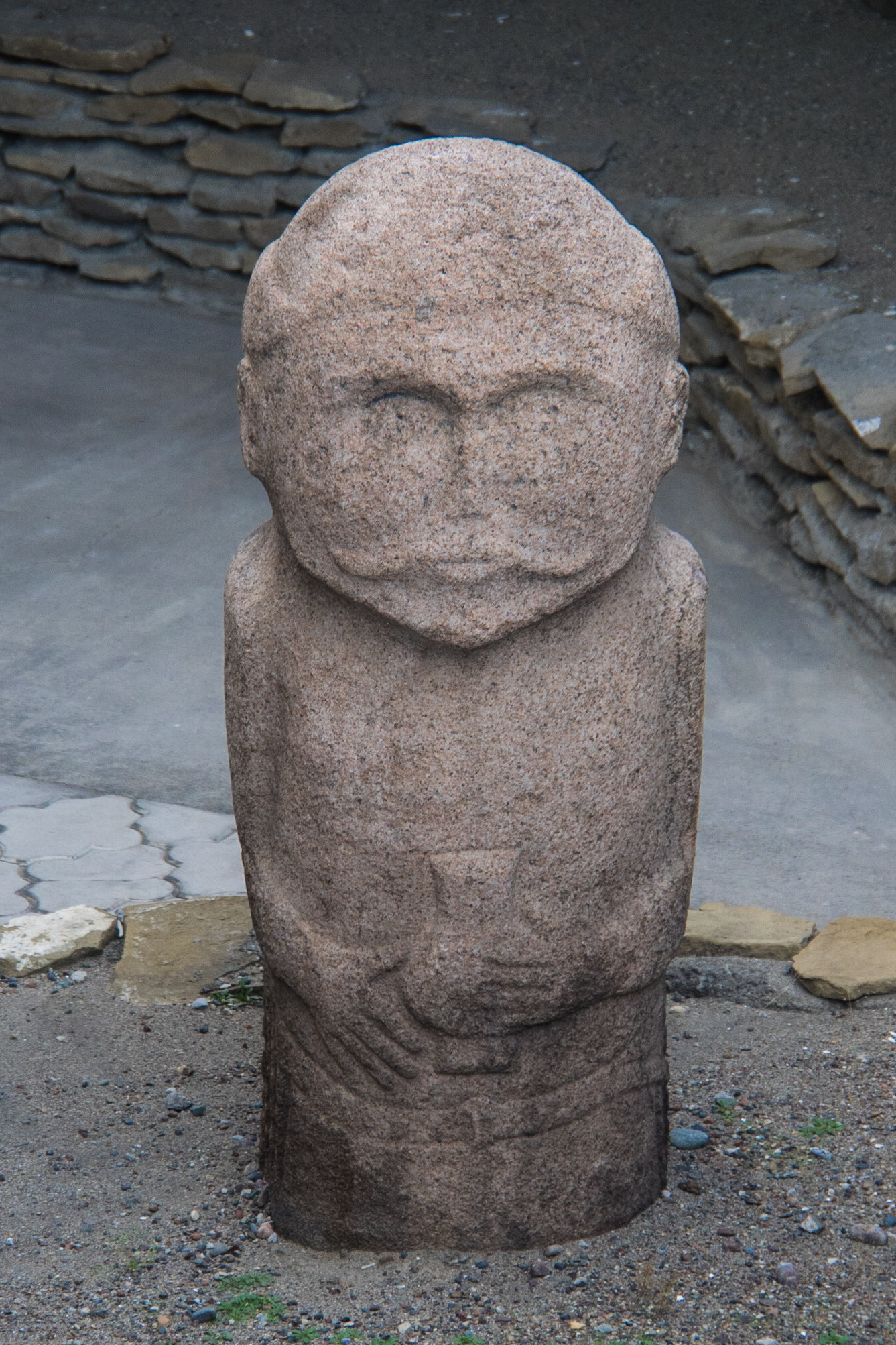
Turkic Balbal, Tuva, Siberia.

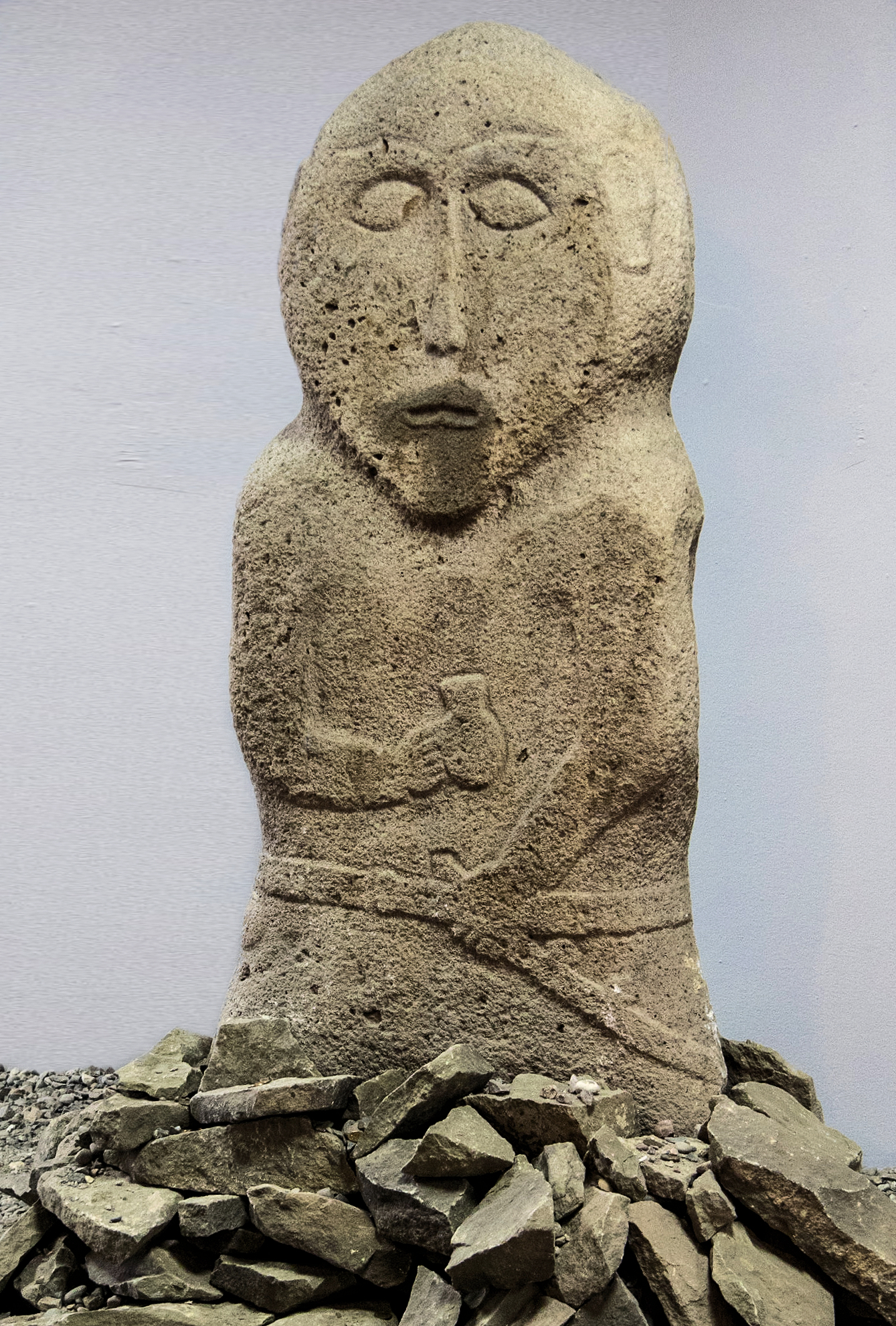
Turkic Balbal, Tuva, Siberia.

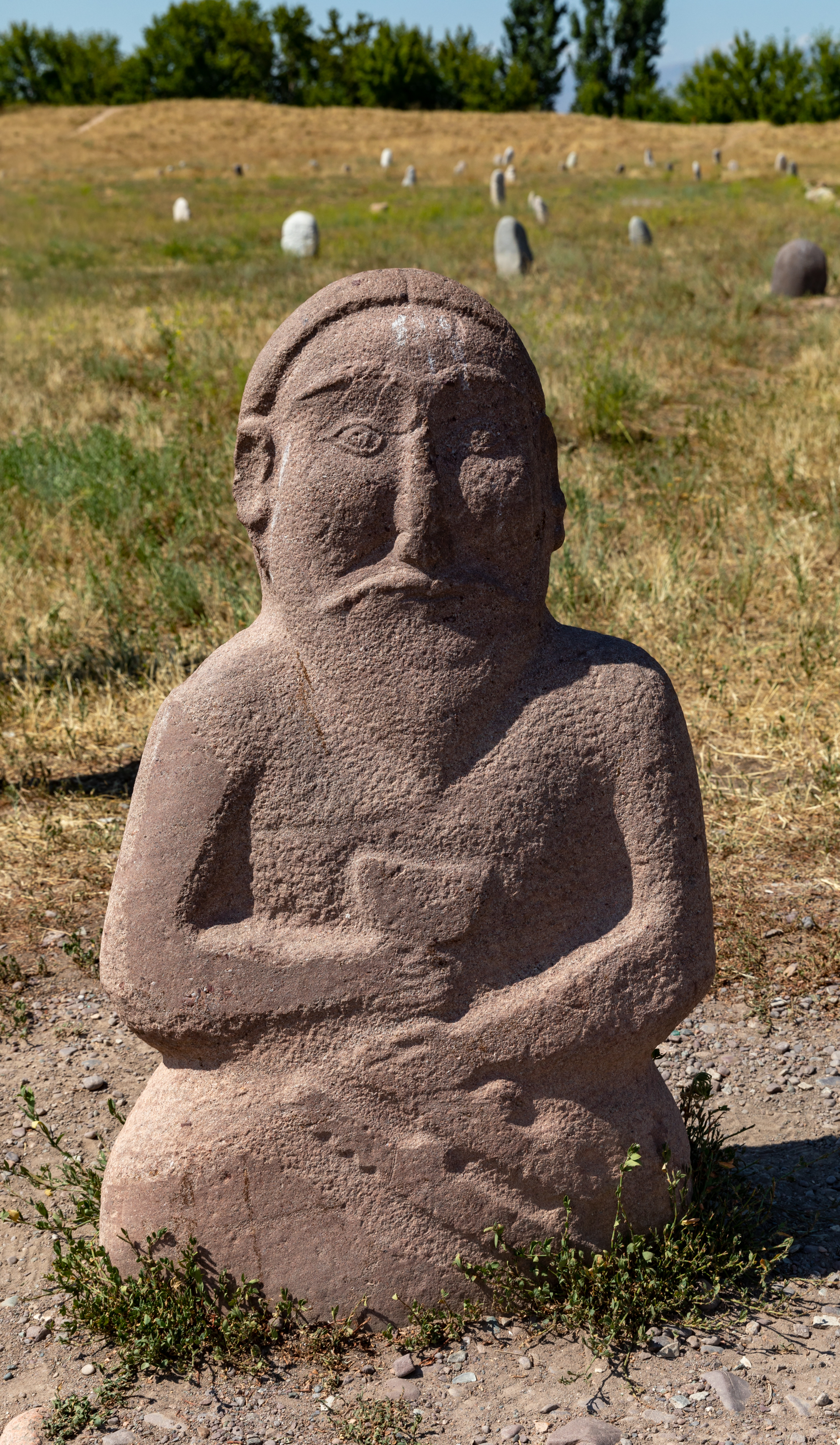
Turkic Balbal, Kyrgyzstan.

== See also ==
- Ashide
- Bugut inscription
- Göktürk family tree
- Böri
- Horses in East Asian warfare
- Kangly
- Orkhon inscription
- Qaghans of the Turkic khaganates
- Timeline of the Turkic peoples (500–1300)
- Turks in the Tang military

== Bibliography ==
- Asimov, M.S. (1998), History of civilizations of Central Asia Volume IV The age of achievement: A.D. 750 to the end of the fifteenth century Part One The historical, social and economic setting, UNESCO Publishing
- Baratova, Larissa (2005). "Turko-Sogdian Coinage". Encyclopedia Iranica.
- Barfield, Thomas (1989), The Perilous Frontier: Nomadic Empires and China, Basil Blackwell
- Benson, Linda (1998), China's last Nomads: the history and culture of China's Kazaks, M.E. Sharpe
- Bregel, Yuri (2003), An Historical Atlas of Central Asia, Brill
- Bosworth, Clifford Edmund (2000), The Age of Achievement: A.D. 750 to the End of the Fifteenth Century – Vol. 4, Part II : The Achievements (History of Civilizations of Central Asia), UNESCO Publishing
- Bughra, Imin (1983), The history of East Turkestan, Istanbul: Istanbul publications
- Damgaard, P. B.; et al. (May 9, 2018). "137 ancient human genomes from across the Eurasian steppes". Nature. 557 (7705). Nature Research: 369–373. Bibcode:2018Natur.557..369D. doi:10.1038/s41586-018-0094-2. hdl:1887/3202709. PMID 29743675. S2CID 13670282.
- Drompp, Michael Robert (2005), Tang China And The Collapse Of The Uighur Empire: A Documentary History, Brill
- Golden, Peter B. (2011), Central Asia in World History, Oxford University Press
- Grousset, René (1970). The empire of the steppes : a history of central Asia. Rutgers University Press. ISBN 978-0-8135-1304-1.
- Haywood, John (1998), Historical Atlas of the Medieval World, AD 600–1492, Barnes & Noble
- Jeong, Choongwon; Wang, Ke; Wilkin, Shevan; Taylor, William Timothy Treal; Miller, Bryan K.; Bemmann, Jan H.; Stahl, Raphaela; Chiovelli, Chelsea; Knolle, Florian; Ulziibayar, Sodnom; Khatanbaatar, Dorjpurev; Erdenebaatar, Diimaajav; Erdenebat, Ulambayar; Ochir, Ayudai; Ankhsanaa, Ganbold (2020-11-12). "A Dynamic 6,000-Year Genetic History of Eurasia's Eastern Steppe". Cell. 183 (4): 890–904.e29. doi:10.1016/j.cell.2020.10.015. ISSN 0092-8674. PMC 7664836. PMID 33157037.
- Kamola, Stefan (2023), I Made Him Praiseworthy: The Kül Tegin Inscription in World History, De Gruyter
- Latourette, Kenneth Scott (1964), The Chinese, their history and culture, Volumes 1–2, Macmillan
- Mackerras, Colin (1990), "Chapter 12 – The Uighurs", in Sinor, Denis (ed.), The Cambridge History of Early Inner Asia, Cambridge University Press, pp. 317–342, ISBN 0-521-24304-1
- Millward, James A. (2007), Eurasian Crossroads: A History of Xinjiang, Columbia University Press
- Mackerras, Colin (1972). The Uighur Empire According to the T'ang Dynastic Histories: A Study in Sino-Uighur Relations. Australian National University Press. pp. 744–840. ISBN 0-7081-0457-6.
- Nachaeva, Ekaterina (2011). "The "Runaway" Avars and Late Antique Diplomacy". In Ralph W. Mathisen; Danuta Shanzer (eds.). Romans, Barbarians, and the Transformation of the Roman World: Cultural Interaction and the Creation of Identity in Late Antiquity. Ashgate.
- Roux, Jean-Paul (2000). Histoire des Turcs (in French). Fayard.
- Sinor, Denis (1969). Inner Asia: History-Civilization-Languages. Indiana University Press.
- Sinor, Denis (1990), The Cambridge History of Early Inner Asia, Cambridge University Press, ISBN 978-0-521-24304-9
- Skaff, Jonathan Karem (2009). Nicola Di Cosmo (ed.). Military Culture in Imperial China. Harvard University Press. ISBN 978-0-674-03109-8.
- Vovin, A. (2019). "Groping in the Dark: The First Attempt to Interpret the Bugut Brahmi Inscription". Journal Asiatique. 307 (1): 121–134.
- Wechsler, Howard J. (1979). "T'ai-Tsung (Reign 626–49): The Consolidator". In Denis Twitchett; John Fairbank (eds.). The Cambridge History of China, Volume 3: Sui and T'ang China Part I. Cambridge University Press. ISBN 978-0-521-21446-9.
- Xiong, Victor Cunrui (2006), Emperor Yang of the Sui Dynasty: His Life, Times, and Legacy, Albany: State University of New York Press, ISBN 9780791482681.
- Xiong, Victor (2008), Historical Dictionary of Medieval China, United States of America: Scarecrow Press, Inc., ISBN 978-0810860537
- 薛宗正 (1992). 突厥史. 中国社会科学出版社. ISBN 978-7-5004-0432-3. OCLC 28622013.
