= İlter =

İlter is a Turkish given name and surname, that may be derived from 7th-century Turkic leader Ilterish Qaghan. The name may refer to:

== Given name ==
- Ilter Tashkin (born 1994), Azerbaijani football player
- İlter Turan (born 1941), Turkish political scientist
- İlter Türkmen (1927–2022), Turkish diplomat and politician
- İlter Pişkin (born 2007), Turkish academic

== Surname ==
- Aydın İlter, Turkish general
- Balçiçek İlter (born 1973), Turkish journalist

== See also ==
- Ilterish Qaghan
