= Böri =

Elite guard unit in early Turkic states

Böri (also Börü)
- Active: 6th–8th centuries
- Country: Göktürk Khaganate; Kipchak confederation
- Allegiance: Khaganate
- Branch: Imperial Guard
- Type: Elite guard unit
- Role: Political and military protection
- Garrison/HQ: Orkhon region

Böri (Old Turkic: wolf; also spelled Börü) was an elite guard unit in early Turkic states, responsible for the close protection of the Khagan (ruler). The term derives from Chinese transcriptions fu-li (拂梨) in Tang‑dynasty records.

== History ==
In the Göktürk Empire (6th–8th centuries), Chinese sources refer to the Khagan's personal guard as fu‑li (拂梨), rendered in Turkic as böri/börü (wolf). Selected from the most valiant nobles at the kurultay, they served as the sovereign's bodyguards during court ceremonies and military campaigns.

Among the Kipchak (Cuman) tribes, a similar concept appeared under the name Bori, often as a title or personal name linked to royal guards.

== Roles and organization ==
- Protection of the Khagan: Forming the innermost defensive ring around the ruler.
- Reconnaissance and intelligence: Mounted scout detachments tasked with infiltration, surveillance, and communication.
- Ceremonial duties: Serving as symbols of authority during peace‑time rituals and occasionally performing administrative tasks.

== Etymology ==
The Turkic word böri/börü means "wolf" and reflects the Chinese transcription fu‑li (拂梨).

1. Legendary origin: Chinese annals recount that the Ashina clan, founders of the Göktürk Khaganate, descended from a she‑wolf ("gök kurt"), symbolically linking the guard's name to divine ancestry.
2. Symbolic meaning: The wolf represents courage, loyalty, and endurance—virtues embodied by the guard unit.

== Symbolic and mythological context ==
In Turkic mythology, the wolf is revered as a sacred creature.

- Depictions of a wolf's head on Göktürk standards evoked both the clan's divine origin and the guard's elite status.

== See also ==
- Ashina tribe
- Göktürk Khaganate
- Cuman people
- Grey wolf (mythology)
