= Ilterish Qaghan =

Founder of the Second Turkic Khaganate

Qaghan of the Second Turkic Khaganate
- Reign: 682–691
- Predecessor: Position established Ashina Funian (claimant)
- Successor: Qapaghan Qaghan
- Regent: Tonyukuk
- Born: Ashina Qutlug 阿史那骨篤祿
- Died: 691
- Spouse: El Bilga Khatun
- Issue: Bilge Qaghan; Kul Tegin; Bögü Qaghan; Inel Qaghan
- House: Ashina
- Father: Etmish Beg
- Religion: Tengrism

Ilterish Qaghan or Ashina Qutlug (Old Turkic: 𐰃𐰠𐱅𐰼𐰾:𐰴𐰍𐰣, romanized: Elteris qaɣan, Chinese: 頡跌利施可汗/颉跌利施可汗 Xiédiēlìshīkěhàn; 阿史那骨篤祿/阿史那骨笃禄, āshǐnà gǔdǔlù, a-shih-na ku-tu-lu, d. 691) was the founder of the Second Turkic Khaganate (reigned 682–691).

== Biography ==
=== Early life ===
Little is known about Ilterish Qaghan's early life. He was a grandson of Illig Qaghan who ruled as the final qaghan of the Eastern Turkic Khaganate. According to the Old Book of Tang, his father served as a chief under the leadership of Sheli Yuanying, the military governor of Yunzhong – a subdivision of the Chanyu Protectorate. The source specifically notes his hereditary title as that of Tutunchuo (Old Turkic: Tudun Çor). However, this is contradicted in the Chinese text inscribed on the stele dedicated to Kul Tigin, in which it is stated that Ilterish Qaghan's father bore the title of Guduolu xiejin, the Chinese rendering of Old Turkic Qutlug Irkin. This potentially suggests that the name Qutlug, borne by Ilterish Qaghan, may have represented a title inherited from his father as opposed to a personal name. Regarding Ilterish Qaghan's rank prior to his ascension as qaghan in 682, the Tonyukuk inscriptions title him as a shad – a special title given to military commanders.

=== Uprising ===
Following the suppression of Ashina Funian's failed rebellion in 681, Ilterish Qaghan rose up in arms against the Tang authorities. He accumulated a military force of over 5,000 troops, partly composed of remnants of the Göktürk rebels who had served under Ashina Funian. He began his military campaigns, initially focusing on attacks against the Tang forces and the Toquz Oghuz confederation to the north.

The Tonyukuk inscriptions record that it was Tonyukuk himself and a certain Boyla Bagha Tarkan who enthroned Ilterish Qaghan. The Chinese sources expand on this, detailing that following his enthronement, Ilterish Qaghan appointed his younger brothers Mochuo as a shad, and Duoxifu as a yabghu.

His attacks on the Tang border regions began on 12 July 682, when they attacked the Lan Prefecture and captured and executed its prefect, Wang Demao. Half a year later, due to the poor climatic conditions in their headquarters, the Turks began plundering the northern borders of the Bing Prefecture. In response to these attacks, the military general Xue Rengui was assigned to defend the Yun Prefecture against Turkic aggression. This culminated in an engagement between the two military forces, resulting in the defeat of the Turks who suffered thousands of losses. However, the Turkic forces resumed their attacks, and in March 683 had plundered the Ding and Gui prefectures. The following month the Turks besieged Chanyu and killed its adjutant, Zhang Xingshi. Similarly, the prefect of the Yu Prefecture – Li Sijian – was also killed following an attack in the region by the Turks.

The military governor of the Feng Prefecture, Cui Zhibian, led an expedition against the Turks. However, this resulted in Cui Zhibian's capture by the Turks. As a result of these defeats and losses, the Tang court almost decided on abandoning the Feng Prefecture, although this did not come to fruition due to opposition from its adjutant, Tang Xiujing. Between June and July 683, the Turks began attacking the Lan Prefecture which resulted in a defeat at the hands of the assistant general Yang Xuanji who routed Ilterish Qaghan's forces. However, due to the incessant attacks on the prefecture, Emperor Gaozong and the Tang court decided to degrade the region to a lesser military institution. On 8 December 683, the commander Cheng Wuting led an expedition against the Turkic headquarters.

=== Conquest of the Toquz Oghuz and Ötüken ===
In 684, Ilterish Qaghan turned his attention to the steppe and initiated his campaign against the Toquz Oghuz. Following the subjugation of the Eastern Turks by the Chinese in 630, the Toquz Oghuz confederation had come to occupy and dominate Ötüken – the former heartland and symbolic centre of the Turks. As such, the ousting of the Toquz Oghuz and reconquest of Ötüken was necessary for Ilterish Qaghan to consolidate his authority and impose himself as suzerain of the steppe, and true qaghan of the Turks and steppe nomads. This campaign is detailed in the Tonyukuk inscriptions. They note that a deserter from the Toquz Oghuz informed the Turkic leaders that the qaghan of the Toquz Oghuz – Baz Qaghan (Yaoluoge Dujiezhi) – had sent letters to the Tang and Khitans, requesting to form a tripartite alliance against the expanding Turks. After learning of this, the adviser and general Tonyukuk informed Ilterish Qaghan and advised him to first attack the Toquz Oghuz. As such, the Turks expanded into Ötüken and defeated a force of 3,000 Toquz Oghuz warriors.

Following the completion of the conquest of Ötüken in 685, the Turks instigated the Toquz Oghuz in turning against the Tang government, thus initiating what the Tang perceived to be another rebellion. In response to this, the Tang dispatched around 30,000 troops from the On Oq under general Tian Yangming to subdue the Toquz Oghuz. The Toquz Oghuz tribes, primarily Uyghurs, which had surrendered to the Tang during the expedition were resettled around the citadel of Tongcheng in the Anbei Protectorate. However, tribes such as the Tongra and Pugu remained in active rebellion and thus the Tang dispatched another general, Liu Jingtong, to suppress the rebels. Due to their sheer number of losses as a result of starvation the Toquz Oghuz eventually surrendered to the Tang and were largely resettled in the Hexi Corridor, allowing for the Turks to fully dominate and resettle Ötüken.

=== Campaign into Shandong ===
On 31 August 684, Ilterish Qaghan and Ashide Yuanzhen began an attack against the Shuo Prefecture, under the protection of general Cheng Wuting. While the Turks encountered difficulties during this campaign as a result of the Tang general's competency, the latter's involvement in a political scandal and execution allowed the Turks to gain the upper hand. Between 11 March and 16 May 685 the Turks began plundering both the Shuo and Dai prefectures, resulting in a clash with general Chunyu Chuping in the Xin Prefecture, the engagement culminating in the loss of around 5,000 Tang troops.

In 686 the general Heukchi Sangji, originally from the Korean state of Baekje, was dispatched by the Tang emperor to intercept the Turks in their raids on Tang territories. The Turk forces suffered a minor defeat at the Battle of Liangjing. While the Turks launched a surprise attack against the Tang camp at sunset, they were ultimately routed by the Tang. Neither Ilterish Qaghan or Ashide Yuanzhen are mentioned in the Chinese accounts of this battle, suggesting that the main body of the Turkic army was dispatched to the north of the Gobi Desert. According to the Tonyukuk inscriptions, the Turkic army under Ilterish Qaghan had managed to campaign deep into Tang territory, reaching the regions of Shandong and Taluy. The former referred to the territories east of the Taihang Mountains while the latter refers to the East China Sea. It is further detailed that the Turks besieged 23 Tang cities during this campaign, although the names of the cities are not mentioned in the inscription and the number may represent the sum of all the Tang cities plundered by the Turks under Ilterish Qaghan's leadership. Chinese sources detail that on 9 April 687 Ilterish Qaghan and Ashide Yuanzhen plundered the city of Changping in the You Prefecture. General Heukchi was sent to intercept the Turks, although the result of this potential engagement is not recorded. Between 12 September and 11 October 687 the Tang general managed to intercept and defeat the Turks during their attack on the Shuo Prefecture, completely routing Ilterish Qaghan's forces. A month after this defeat, the Tang general Cuan Baobi volunteered to capture the remnants of the defeated Turks that had fled north of the Gobi. While the Tang court had ordered the general to march alongside Heukchi, the former decided to independently lead his troops into Turkic territory. The battle between the Turks and general Cuan Baobi resulted in the annihilation of Cuan's army – as such, on 19 November 687, the Tang general was executed by Empress Wu.

=== Tang, On Oq, and Kyrgyz coalition against the Turks ===
Following his victory over general Cuan Baobi, between 688- and 694, Ilterish Qaghan began concentrating on a western campaign. According to the Tonyukuk inscriptions, the Tang, On Oq (headed by the Türgesh under Üç Elig Khagan), and Kyrgyz appear to have formed a military coalition against the Turks. The tripartite alliance aimed to dispatch troops to the Altai Mountains and from there expand into the territories of the Turks, and destroy the newly formed polity.

Tonyukuk advised Ilterish Qaghan to campaign against the Kyrgyz first. After a 10-day trek across the Sayan and Tannu-Ola mountains, the Turkic troops launched an ambush on the Kyrgyz while their troops were sleeping. This resulted in the annihilation of the Kyrgyz force and the execution of their qaghan, thus the Kyrgyz surrendered and pledged allegiance to Ilterish Qaghan. Following this victory, the Turks began their attack on the Türgesh. The inscriptions note that Ilterish Qaghan himself had to return to Ötüken as his khatun, Ilbilga Khatun, had died and a funerary feast was required. Consequently, his son Inel Qaghan and his brother Mochuo (under the title of Tardush Shad) were appointed as the nominal heads of the army, while actual command of the campaign was transferred to Tonyukuk. Tonyukuk led the Turkic army across the Irtysh and engaged the Türgesh, who were supported by a retinue of Tang soldiers, in battle at the Yarïsh Plain, defeating them completely. The Türgesh qaghan was captured while both the Türgesh shad and yabghu were executed. Possibly describing the result of this battle, Chinese sources note that between 7 November and 5 December 690, over 60,000 On Oq surrendered to the Tang court, settling within its borders. The Turks then expanded westwards, extracting tribute from peoples such as the Tocharians and Sogdians.

=== Later life and death ===
Little is known about the later years of Ilterish Qaghan's life and his death. The Tonyukuk inscriptions do not provide any information on his death, only detailing Mochuo's succession to the throne at the age of 27 following his brother's death, with the title of Qapaghan Qaghan. When analysed together with the Kul Tigin and Bilge Qaghan inscriptions, both of which claim that the two eponymous figures were 7 and 8 years old respectively when their father died, suggests that Ilterish Qaghan died in 691.

== Kultegin's memorial complex ==
Ilterish is also mentioned in lines 10 to 12 of the Kul Tigin inscription as follows:

...Then the god of the Turks above, and the sacred earth and water of the Turks did as follows: so that the Turkic people would not be annihilated, and so that they could become a people again, they raised my father llterish Qaghan and my mother Ilbilge Khatun from the heigts of heaven. My father the qaghan set off with seventeen men, upon hearing that Ilterish was rising in revolt those in the towns went up to the mountains, those in the mountains came down, and they gathered to be seventy warriors. Because Tengri gave them strength, the soldiers of my father the qaghan were like wolves, and his enemies were like sheep.

== Legacy ==
Kutlu, Kutluk, İlter and İlteriş are common masculine Turkish given names, which are used in memory of Ilterish Qaghan. Mihaly Dobrovits believes he changed lateral system of succession to primogeniture, thus trying to avoid the fate of the First Turkic Khaganate.

On 23 August 2022, his memorial complex and an inscription written in Turkic and Sogdian were found at Khangai Mountains, in Mongolia's Otuken region.

== Sources ==
- Christian, David (1998). A History of Russia, Central Asia, and Mongolia, Volume I. Blackwell Publishers. ISBN 0-631-20814-3.

Ilterish Qaghan Ashina Clan
| Preceded by none Ashina Funian (claimant) | Qaghan of the Second Turkic Khaganate; 681–694 | Succeeded by Qapgan Khagan |
