= Miho funerary couch =

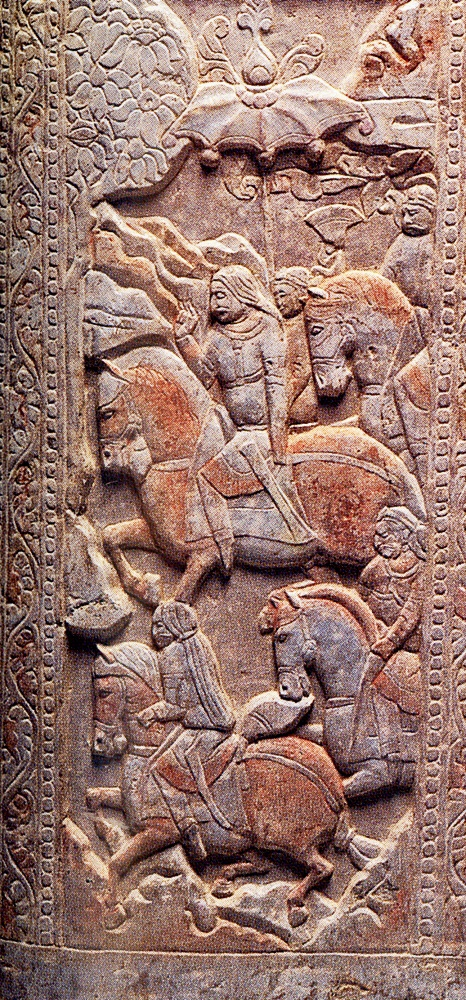
- Turkic horsemen with long hair on the Miho funerary couch. Circa 570 CE. Northern Dynasties, China.
- Created: Circa 570 CE.
- Discovered: Northern China

The Miho funerary couch is a Northern Dynasties period (439-589 CE) funeral monument to a Sogdian nobleman and official in northern China. The tomb is now located in the collections of the Miho Museum. Its structure is similar to that of the Anyang funerary bed. It has been dated to circa 570 CE. It is rumoured to have been excavated in Taiyuan in the 1980s, before being sold on the American art market.

== The tomb ==
The stone couch is composed of 11 stone slabs and 2 gate pillars, decorated with reliefs showing the life of the deceased and scenes of the afterlife. Many elements of Zoroastrianism appear in the reliefs.

The owner of the tomb was probably in charge of commercial affairs for foreign merchants from Middle Asia doing businesses in China, as well as Zoroastrian affairs. He probably held the official Chinese title "Sàbǎo" (薩保, "Protector, Guardian", derived from the Sogdian word s’rtp’w, "caravan leader"), used for government-appointed leaders of the Sogdian immigrant-merchant community.

== Ethnographical aspects ==
Numerous Turkic men appear in the reliefs of the Miho funerary couch. As for the Tomb of An Jia, the depictions in the tomb show the omnipresence of the Turks (at the time of the First Turkic Khaganate), who were probably the main trading partners of Sogdian merchants. The Hephthalites are essentially absent from the Tomb of An Jia, but appear in four panels of the Miho funerary couch with somewhat caricatural features and characteristics of vassals to the Turks. The Hephthalites probably had been replaced by Turkic hegemony by that time (they were destroyed by the alliance of the Sasanians and the Turks between 556 and 560 CE). In contrast, the Hephthalites are omnipresent in the Tomb of Wirkak, who, although he died at the same time of An Jia was much older at 85: Wirkak may therefore have primarily dealt with the Hephthalites during his active years.

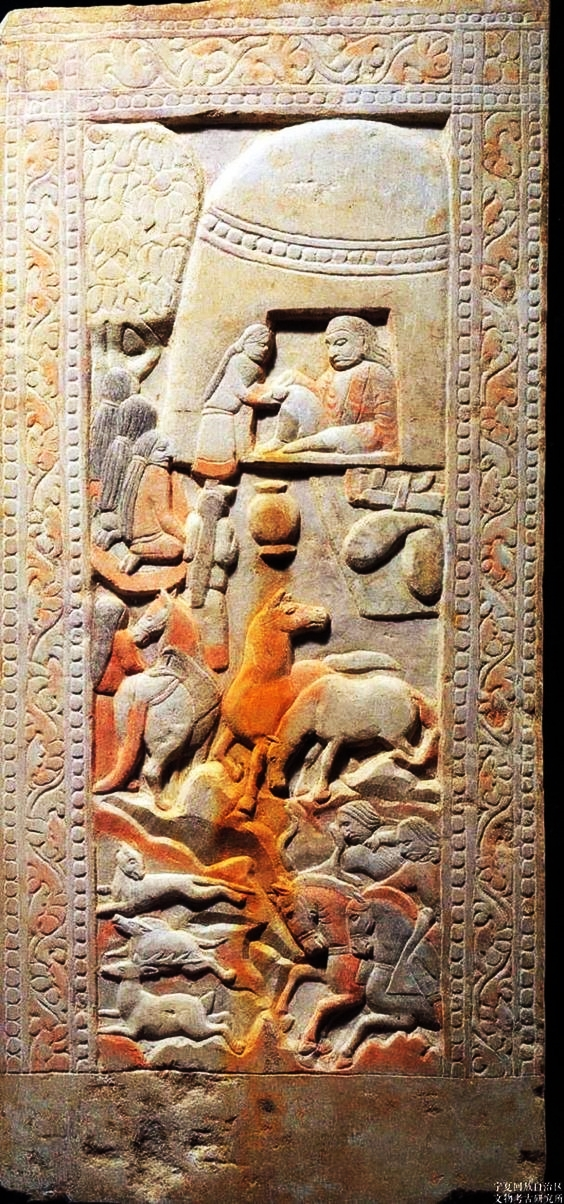
Türks in the Kazakh steppe.

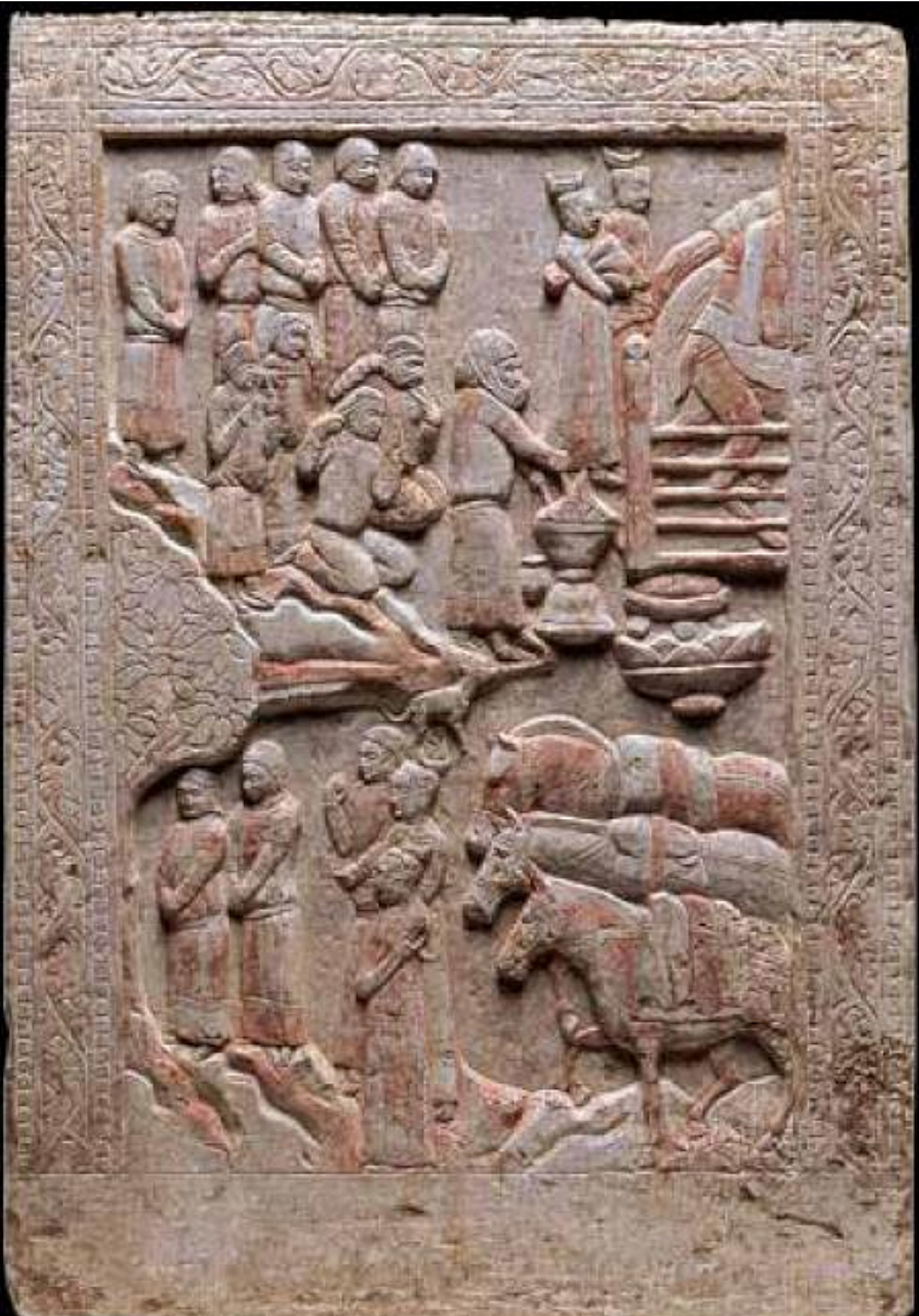
Miho couch central panel, with Zoroastrian fire ceremony scene.
