= Kutlu =

- Language: Turkish

Origin
- Language: Turkish
- Origin: kut
- Derivation: "kut" + "lu"
- Meaning: "holy", "hooly", "blessed" ,"Happy","Auspicious", "Lucky "

Other names
- Cognates: Kutlug, Kutluğ
- See also: Kutalmış, Aykut, Orkut

Kutlu is a common masculine Turkish given name. In Turkish, "Kutlu" means "holy", "hooly", and/or "blessed".

== Given name ==
- Kutlu Adalı, Turkish Cypriot journalist
- Kutlu Özmakinacı, bassist of Turkish rock band Yüksek Sadakat.
- Kutlu Torunlar, Turkish sailor.

== Surname ==
- Ayla Kutlu, Turkish author (see Turkish Wikipedia article).
- Hakan Kutlu, Turkish footballer

== Places ==
- Kutlu, Düzce
