= Orkut (given name) =

Male given name

Other names
- Related names: Orhan, Kutalmış, Kutlu

Orkut (pronounced [ˈoːɾkut]) is a Turkish given name composed of or ('create') and kut ('holy') so that the name means "holy ground".

Notable people with the name include:

- Orkut Büyükkökten, Turkish software engineer who developed the social networking service Orkut
