= Ayhan =

Ayhan is a unisex Turkish given name. In Turkish, it means 'king of the moon'. In Turkish literature, Ay means moon and Han means king. Ayhan is a popular name throughout Asia and some parts of Europe. It is also used as a surname in Turkey.

== Given name ==
=== Male ===
==== First name ====
- Ayhan Akman (born 1977), Turkish football player
- Ayhan Bilgen (born 1971), Turkish journalist and politician
- Ayhan Çarkın (born 1962), Turkish policeman
- Ayhan Erel (born 1957), Turkish politician
- Ayhan Elmastaşoğlu (born 1941), Turkish football player
- Ayhan Gezen (born 1972), Turkish-German football player
- Ayhan Güçlü (born 1990), Turkish football player
- Ayhan Işık (1929–1979), Turkish actor
- Ayhan Karakuş (born 1989), Turkish wrestler
- Ayhan Kartal (1966–2000), Turkish rapist and child killer
- Ayhan Kaynak (born 1967), Turkish football player
- Ayhan Songar (1926–1997), Turkish academic and psychiatrist
- Ayhan Sökmen (1929–2013), Turkish composer and physician
- Ayhan Şahenk (1929–2001), Turkish businessman
- Ayhan Taşkın (born 1953), Turkish wrestler

==== Middle name ====
- Ece Ayhan Çağlar (1931–2002), Turkish poet

=== Female ===
- Ayhan Aydan (1924–2009), Turkish opera singer

== Surname ==
- Burcu Ayhan (born 1990), Turkish high jumper
- Devran Ayhan (born 1978), Turkish football player
- İbrahim Ayhan (1968–2018), Turkish politician
- Kaan Ayhan (born 1994), Turkish football player
- Pınar Ayhan (born 1972), Turkish singer
- Sally Ayhan (born 1983), Australian news presenter and correspondent
- Süreyya Ayhan (born 1978), Turkish middle-distance runner
- Yalçın Ayhan (born 1982), Turkish football player
