= Orhan (name) =

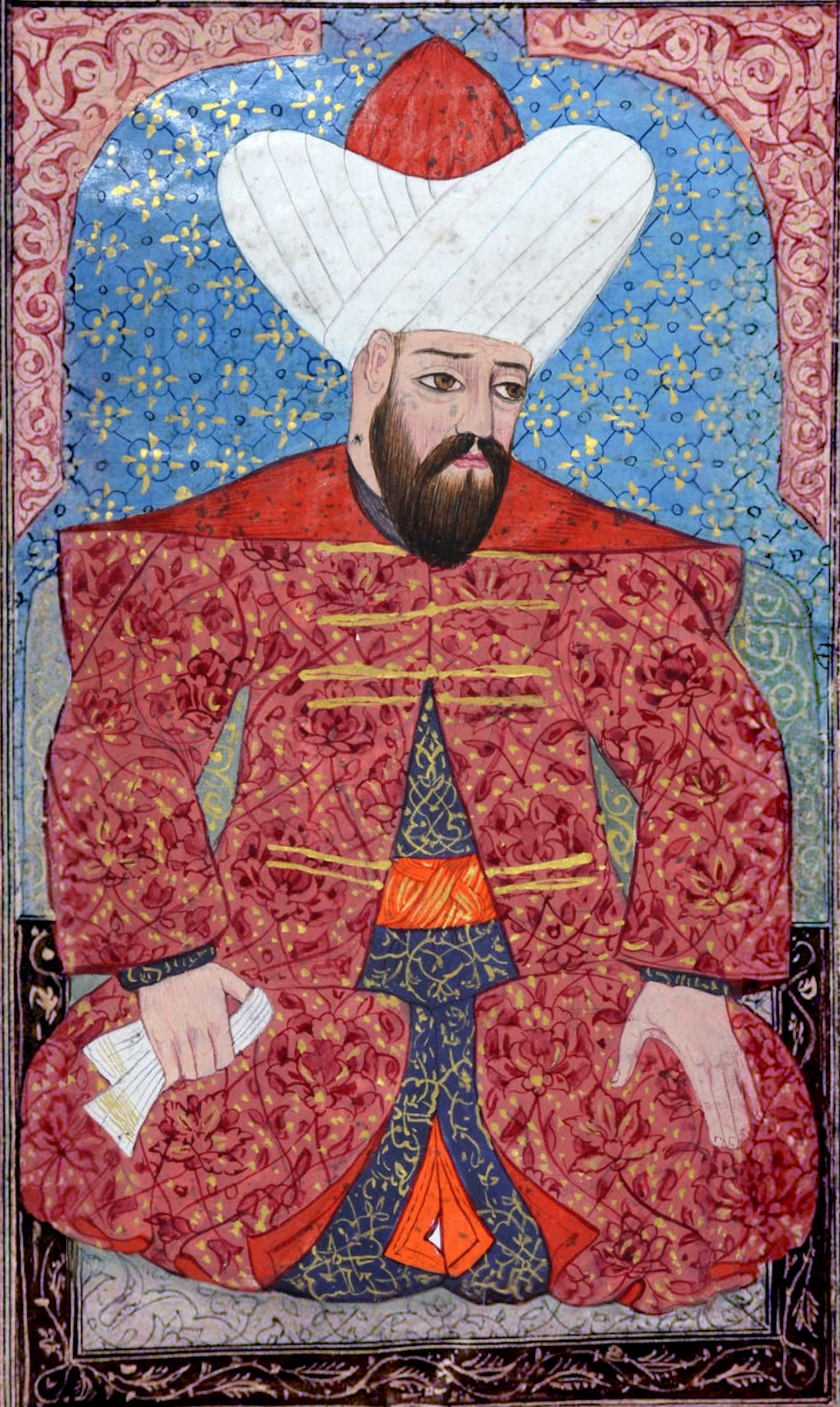
Detail of an Ottoman miniature painting depicting Orhan, Sultan of the Ottoman Empire from 1326 to 1360. The painting is preserved at the Topkapı Palace Museum in Istanbul, Turkey.

Orhan is a Turkish surname and masculine given name that means Khan of the fortress.

Notable people with the name include:

== First name ==
- Orhan (1281–1362), Ottoman sultan
- Orhan Ademi (born 1991), Albanian football player
- Orhan Aksoy, multiple people
- Orhan Aytür (born 1965), Turkish World champion amateur underwater photographer
- Orhan Birgit (1927–2019), Turkish lawyer, politician and journalist
- Orhan Boran (1928–2012), Turkish radio and TV host
- Orhan Çıkırıkçı (born 1967), Turkish football player
- Orhan Çelebi (1412–1453), Ottoman prince
- Orhan Demir (born 1954), Canadian jazz guitarist of Turkish origin
- Orhan Džepar (born 1996), Dutch football player
- Orhan Eyüpoğlu (1918–1980), Turkish politician
- Orhan Gencebay (born 1944), Turkish musician
- Orhan Gülle (born 1992), Turkish football player
- Orhan Karaveli (1930–2023), Turkish journalist and writer
- Orhan Kemal (1914–1970), Turkish novelist
- Orhan Miroğlu (born 1953), Turkish politician
- Orhan Mustafi (born 1990), Albanian football player
- Orhan Öztrak (1914–1995), Turkish jurist and politician
- Orhan Pamuk (born 1952), Nobel-winning Turkish novelist
- Orhan Türkdoğan (1928–2024), Turkish sociologist

== Middle name ==
- Asım Orhan Barut (1926–1994), Turkish-American theoretical physicist

== Surname ==
- Çekdar Orhan (born 1998), Turkish football player
- Kenan Orhan (born 1993), Turkish-American writer
- Mehmed Orhan (1909–1994), member of the Osmanlı dynasty
- Mahmut Orhan (born 1993), Turkish musical artist
- Yılmaz Orhan (born 1955), Cypriot football player

== Other uses ==
- MV Karadeniz Powership Orhan Bey, powership
