= Aykut =

Aykut is a Turkish masculine name and may refer to:

== Given name ==
- Aykut Demir (born 1988), Turkish footballer
- Aykut Erçetin (born 1982), Turkish footballer
- Aykut Hilmi, British actor
- Aykut Karaman (born 1947), Turkish architect
- Aykut Kaya (karateka) (born 1990), Turkish karateka
- Aykut Kocaman (born 1965), former Turkish footballer
- Aykut Özer (born 1993), Turkish footballer
- Aykut Öztürk (born 1987), Turkish footballer

== Surname ==
- İmren Aykut (born 1940), Turkish female economist, politician and former government minister
- Serkan Aykut (born 1975), former Turkish footballer
