= Wei Sili =

Wei Sili (Chinese: 韋嗣立; 654–719), courtesy name Yangou (延構), posthumous name Duke Xiao of Xiaoyao (逍遙孝公), was an official of China's Tang dynasty and Wu Zhou dynasty, serving as a chancellor during the reigns of Wu Zetian, her sons Emperor Zhongzong and Emperor Ruizong, and her grandson Emperor Shang.

== Background ==
Wei Sili was born in 654, during the reign of Emperor Gaozong. His father Wei Siqian was a mid-level official at the time (and would eventually serve as chancellor from 685 to 687, during the first reign of Emperor Gaozong's son Emperor Ruizong), and he was born of Wei Siqian's then-wife Lady Wang. He had at least one older half-brother, Wei Chengqing, born of a previous wife of Wei Siqian. It was said that Lady Wang was very strict in her discipline of Wei Chengqing because he was not born of her, and whenever she punished Wei Chengqing, Wei Sili would ask to be punished in Wei Chengqing's stead—and when she refused, he would have the household servants punish him in the same manner Lady Wang was punishing Wei Chengqing. Lady Wang saw this and realized that she needed to give Wei Chengqing better treatment. When others heard of this, they compared the Wei brothers to the Jin dynasty (266–420) officials Wang Xiang and Wang Lan (王覽)—half-brothers in a situation similar to the Wei brothers.

Wei Sili passed the imperial examinations in his youth, and initially served as the magistrate of Shuangliu County (雙流, in modern Chengdu, Sichuan), and was said to have governed the county so well that his performance evaluations topped those of other counties in the region.

== During Wu Zetian's reign ==
Sometime prior to 699, during the reign of Emperor Gaozong's wife Wu Zetian (who had displaced her own son Emperor Ruizong in 690 and taken the throne as "emperor" of a new Zhou dynasty, interrupting Tang), Wei Sili was serving as the magistrate of Laiwu County (萊蕪, in modern Laiwu, Shandong), when Wei Chengqing, then serving as Fengge Sheren (鳳閣舍人), a mid-level official at the legislative bureau of government (鳳閣, Fengge), was removed on account of illness. Wu Zetian recalled Wei Sili and told him, "Your father had once told me, 'I have two sons who are faithful and filially pious, who are capable of serving Your Imperial Majesty.' I have seen that both your brother and you are capable, just as your father said. Now I am going to make you Fengge Sheren, and let you brothers succeed each other." She then issued the commission, making him Fengge Sheren. At that time, imperial education, which had been emphasized by early Tang emperors, had largely been halted, and Wei Sili, finding the situation a bad one, as well as the penal punishments at the time to be too harsh, submitted a lengthy petition to Wu Zetian, advocating reemphasis on education and leniency for accused criminals. Historical records did not indicate what Wu Zetian's response was to him.

At some point thereafter, he was made the deputy minister of justice (秋官侍郎, Qiuguan Shilang), and as of 704, he was the deputy minister of civil service affairs (天官侍郎, Tianguan Shilang), when he was made Fengge Shilang (鳳閣侍郎), the deputy head of the legislative bureau. He was also given the designation Tong Fengge Luantai Pingzhangshi (同鳳閣鸞臺平章事), making him a chancellor de facto. Soon thereafter, in response to the problem that imperial officials were not willing to be local officials, the chancellors Tang Xiujing and Li Jiao suggested that the officials at the central government be assigned to the prefectures and counties to serve as officials, offering to go first themselves. Wu Zetian had 20 officials randomly drawn, and Wei was one of the ones drawn. He was thus, in addition to his central government responsibilities, given additional responsibility of serving as prefect of Bian Prefecture (汴州, roughly modern Kaifeng, Henan). In winter 704, he became prefect of Wei Prefecture (魏州, in modern Handan, Hebei), but continued to serve in his central government posts as well, and around that time, when Wu Zetian asked for the chancellors to recommend people who could be capable to serve as low level officials in various ministries, Wei was set to recommend Cen Xi, a county magistrate, but then made the comment, "Alas, his uncle was Cen Changqian, and he suffers from the taint." (Cen Changqian served as chancellor late in Emperor Ruizong's reign and early in Wu Zetian's reign, but was executed in 691 on accusation of treason.) Wu Zetian responded, "As long as he is capable, what taint can there be?" She then made Cen Xi an official based on Wei's recommendation. Soon thereafter, Wei Chengqing became a chancellor as well, and as Wu Zetian did not like having multiple members of a clan serving as chancellors simultaneously, Wei Sili was removed from his chancellor post and made the principle of the university for nobles (成均祭酒, Chengjun JIjiu) and also continued to act as the prefect of Wei Prefecture, although he was soon moved to Ming Prefecture (洺州, also in modern Handan).

== During Emperor Zhongzong's second reign ==
In 705, Wu Zetian was overthrown in a coup, and her son Li Xian the Crown Prince, a former emperor, was restored to the throne (as Emperor Zhongzong). Wei Sili's brother Wen Chengqing was accused of having flattered her lover Zhang Changzong in his editing of the imperial history. Wei Chengqing was reduced to commoner rank and exiled, while Wei Sili was demoted to be the prefect of Rao Prefecture (roughly modern Shangrao, Jiangxi). In 706, Wei Sili was recalled to be the deputy minister of husbandry (太僕少卿, Taipu Shaoqing) and also participate in selecting officials for civil service, but soon he was made the prefect of Xiang Prefecture (相州, in modern Handan as well). When Wei Chengqing died, after having been made Huangmen Shilang (黃門侍郎), the deputy head of the examination bureau (門下省, Menxia Sheng) but not taken office, Emperor Zhongzong much mourned Wei Chengqing and recalled Wei Sili to attend Wei Chengqing's funeral. He then made Wei Sili Huangmen Shilang. Later, Wei Sili was made the minister of reserves (太府卿, Taifu Qing) and an imperial scholar at Xiuwen Pavilion (脩文館).

In 709, Wei Sili was made the minister of defense (兵部尚書, Bingbu Shangshu) and made chancellor again with the designation Tong Zhongshu Menxia Sanpin (同中書門下三品). At that time, Emperor Zhongzong had been expending much revenue in building many temples and had also giving many individuals fiefs in rich prefectures, thus depriving the imperial treasury of a major part of its revenue and creating disturbance for the people in that these fief-holders often sent their servants to forcibly collect revenue from their fiefs. Wei Sili, concerned about the drain on the imperial treasury, submitted a petition that suggested that the temple constructions be halted and that the collection of tributes to the fief-holders be streamlined—that the fiefs be reduced in size, that the households in the fiefs be simply required to submit a tax, and that the fief-holders then be paid out of the imperial treasury. Emperor Zhongzong did not accept his proposal.

Wei Sili was a distant relative of Emperor Zhongzong's powerful wife Empress Wei—her father Wei Xuanzhen (韋玄貞) shared a 12th generation ancestor with Wei Sili, the Cao Wei official Wei Mu (韋穆)—and Emperor Zhongzong ordered that the Wei Sili's line be merged into Empress Wei's clan. Thereafter Emperor Zhongzong began to give Wei Sili progressively more awards. When Wei Sili built a summer mansion at Mount Li (驪山), near Chang'an, Emperor Zhongzong personally visited it in 709 and wrote poetry praising the mansion. He gave Wei Sili an award of silk and, as a distant cousin of Wei Sili's clan, Wei Xiong (韋敻), had been given the title of Duke of Xiaoyao (meaning, "duke of carefreeness") during Northern Zhou, Emperor Zhongzong created Wei Sili the Duke of Xiaoyao.

== During Emperor Shang's reign and Emperor Ruizong's second reign ==
In 710, Emperor Zhongzong died suddenly—a death that traditional historians believed to be a poisoning carried out by Empress Wei and their daughter Li Guo'er the Princess Anle, so Empress Wei could become emperor like Wu Zetian and Li Guo'er could become crown princess. In the meantime, however, Emperor Zhongzong's son by a concubine, Li Chongmao the Prince of Wen was made emperor (as Emperor Shang), with Empress Wei serving as empress dowager and regent. Under a will that Emperor Zhongzong's sister Princess Taiping and concubine Consort Shangguan Wan'er initially drafted, apparently as a compromise, Emperor Zhongzong's brother Li Dan the Prince of Xiang (the former Emperor Ruizong) would have been made coregent, but the plan was opposed by Empress Dowager Wei's cousin Wei Wen and another chancellor, Zong Chuke, and Li Dan was not made coregent.

Less than a month, Princess Taiping and Li Dan's son Li Longji the Prince of Linzi led a coup and killed Empress Wei and Li Guo'er. During the subsequent confusion when the coup army was slaughtering Empress Wei's clan, Wei Sili was nearly killed, but Li Dan's oldest son Li Chengqi the Prince of Song, whose aunt had married Wei Sili, interceded and saved Wei Sili. However, as a part of a purge of chancellors from Empress Dowager Wei's administration, Wei Sili was demoted to be the prefect of Songzhou. Almost immediately thereafter, though, he was recalled to serve as Zhongshu Ling (中書令), the head of the legislative bureau and a post considered one for a chancellor. A month later, however, he was again demoted to be the prefect of Xu Prefecture (許州, roughly modern Xuchang, Henan), although he was given a fief of 100 households.

== During Emperor Xuanzong's reign ==
Early in the Kaiyuan era (713–741, when Li Longji had become emperor (as Emperor Xuanzong), having been passed the throne by Emperor Ruizong in 712, Wei Sili was recalled to serve as the principal of the imperial university (國子祭酒, Guozi Jijiu). In 714, he was also carrying the title Taizi Binke (太子賓客) as an advisor to the Crown Prince, when the imperial censor Jiang Hui (姜晦), pointing out that at the time that Wei Wen and Zong Chuke altered Emperor Zhongzong's will to remove Emperor Ruizong as coregent, Wei Sili, Wei Anshi, Zhao Yanzhao, and Li Jiao were all chancellors and did nothing to stop them, had his subordinate Guo Zhen (郭震) file an indictment against the former chancellors. These former chancellors were all demoted, with Wei Sili reduced to being the secretary general of Yue Prefecture (岳州, roughly modern Yueyang, Hunan). Some time later, Wei Sili was serving as the prefect of Chen Prefecture (陳州, roughly modern Zhoukou, Henan), when Liu Zhirou (劉知柔), the examiner of Henan Circuit, which included Chen Prefecture, submitted a report opining that Wei Sili had not done anything wrong. Emperor Xuanzong was set to follow Liu's recommendation and recall Wei, when Wei died in 719. He was posthumously honored.

== Notes and references ==
- Old Book of Tang, vol. 88.
- New Book of Tang, vol. 116.
- Zizhi Tongjian, vols. 206, 207, 209, 211.
