= Xue Ji =

Chinese Tang dynasty chancellor (649–713)

Xue Ji (Chinese: 薛稷; 649 – July 29, 713), courtesy name Sitong (嗣通), was a Chinese calligrapher, painter, and politician of the Tang dynasty, briefly serving as chancellor during the reign of Emperor Ruizong. He was considered one of the four greatest calligraphers of early Tang, along with Yu Shinan, Ouyang Xun, and Chu Suiliang.

== Background ==
Xue Ji was born in 649, the first year of the reign of Emperor Gaozong of Tang. He was a great-grandson of Xue Daoheng (薛道衡), an important official of the preceding Sui dynasty. Xue Yuanchao – a chancellor during Emperor Gaozong's reign – was a cousin to his grandfather Xue Xingcheng (薛行成). Xue Xingcheng was a county magistrate, and Xue Ji's father Xue Renwei (薛仁偉) was not recorded with any official titles. However, it is known that Xue Ji's mother was a daughter of the famed chancellor Wei Zheng. Xue Ji passed the imperial examinations at one point, although the date is not known. Late in the reign of Emperor Gaozong's wife Wu Zetian, he served as an imperial attendant, along with her lovers Zhang Yizhi and Zhang Changzong and several officials with literary talents, including Ji Xu, Tian Guidao (田歸道), Li Jiongxiu, and Yuan Banqian (員半千).

== During Emperor Zhongzong's second reign ==
As of the second reign of Emperor Gaozong's and Wu Zetian's son Emperor Zhongzong (705-710), Xue Ji was serving as Zhongshu Sheren (中書舍人), a mid-level official at the legislative bureau of government (中書省, Zhongshu Sheng). At that time, his second cousin Xue Yao (薛曜) was serving at the examination bureau (門下省, Menxia Sheng), and both of them were known for their literary talent. Later in Emperor Zhongzong's reign, he served as Jianyi Daifu (諫議大夫), an imperial advisor, and also served as an imperial scholar at Zhaowen Pavilion (昭文館). As his grandfather Wei Zheng's household held many important literary and artistic works, he had access to many calligraphic works of Yu Shinan and Chu Suiliang, and he, following their style, was a well-known calligrapher himself. He was also an accomplished painter. At that time, Emperor Zhongzong's brother Li Dan the Prince of Xiang was also a calligrapher, and he became acquainted with Xue. As part of this relationship, he married his daughter Princess Xianyuan to Xue's son Xue Boyang (薛伯陽).

== During Emperor Shang's reign and Emperor Ruizong's second reign ==
In 710, Emperor Zhongzong died suddenly—a death traditional historians believed to be a poisoning carried out by his powerful wife Empress Wei and her daughter Li Guo'er the Princess Anle, so that Empress Wei could become "emperor" like Wu Zetian, and Li Guo'er could become crown princess. Meanwhile, Emperor Zhongzong's son by a concubine, Li Chongmao the Prince of Wen, was named emperor (as Emperor Shang), but Empress Wei retained power as empress dowager and regent. Less than a month later, Emperor Zhongzong's sister Princess Taiping and nephew Li Longji the Prince of Linzi (Li Dan's son) rose in rebellion and killed Empress Dowager Wei and Li Guo'er. Li Dan, himself a former emperor, was restored to the throne (as Emperor Ruizong), displacing Emperor Shang. One of the chancellors that Emperor Ruizong commissioned was Zhong Shaojing, whose support to Li Longji was instrumental during the coup. However, Zhong was not from a prominent clan and had been a low level official previously, and this drew resentment from officials from established clans.

Xue, who had been made deputy minister of worship (太常少卿, Taichang Shaoqing) and had been in charge of drafting imperial edicts, along with Su Ting, suggested to Zhong that he demonstrate modesty by offering to resign—something often done when high level officials are commissioned and mostly done ceremonially—and when Zhong did, Xue entered the palace and persuaded Emperor Ruizong to accept the resignation. Subsequently, Xue was made Zhongshu Shilang (中書侍郎), the deputy head of the legislative bureau, given the designation Canzhi Zhengshi (參知政事), making him a chancellor de facto. Soon, however, he repeatedly argued with another chancellor, Cui Riyong—with Xue accusing Cui of flattering Wu Sansi, and Cui accusing Xue of flattering Zhang Yizhi and Zong Chuke. Emperor Ruizong, tired of their bickering, removed both of them from their chancellor posts, with Xue becoming Zuo Sanqi Changshi (左散騎常侍), a senior advisor at the examination bureau.

== During Emperor Xuanzong's reign ==
Meanwhile, the government became divided between the parties of Princess Taiping and Li Longji, to whom Emperor Ruizong passed the throne in 712 and who took the throne as Emperor Xuanzong. After Emperor Xuanzong's enthronement, however, his struggles with Princess Taiping continued, as she continued to highly influence politics through Emperor Ruizong, who retained power as Taishang Huang (retired emperor).

By 713, it was said that Princess Taiping, Dou Huaizhen, Cen Xi, Xiao Zhizhong, Cui Shi, Xue; along with other officials Li Jin (李晉) the Prince of Xinxing (a grandson of Li Deliang (李德良), a cousin of Tang's founder Emperor Gaozu), Li You (李猷), Jia Yingfu (賈膺福), Tang Jun (唐晙); the generals Chang Yuankai (常元楷), Li Ci (李慈), and Li Qin (李欽); and the monk Huifan (惠範), were plotting to overthrow Emperor Xuanzong. It was further said that they discussed, with the lady in waiting Lady Yuan, poisoning the gastrodia elata that Emperor Xuanzong routinely took as an aphrodisiac. When this alleged plot was reported to Emperor Xuanzong by Wei Zhigu, Emperor Xuanzong – who had already received advice from Wang Ju (王琚), Zhang Shuo, and Cui Riyong to act first – did so. He convened a meeting with his brothers Li Fan (李範) the Prince of Qi, Li Ye (李業) the Prince of Xue, Guo Yuanzhen, along with a number of his associates — the general Wang Maozhong (王毛仲), the officials Jiang Jiao (姜皎) and Li Lingwen (李令問), his brother-in-law Wang Shouyi (王守一), the eunuch Gao Lishi, and the military officer Li Shoude (李守德) — and decided to act first. On July 29, Emperor Xuanzong had Wang Maozhong take 300 soldiers to the imperial guard camp to behead Chang and Li Ci. Then, Jia, Li You, Xiao, and Cen were arrested and executed as well. Dou and Princess Taiping committed suicide. Emperor Ruizong yielded powers to Emperor Xuanzong and no longer actively participated in policy decisions thereafter. Xue was arrested and imprisoned at the jail of Wannian County (萬年, one of the counties making up the capital Chang'an) and ordered to commit suicide. His son Xue Boyang was spared on the basis that he was the emperor's brother-in-law, but was exiled, and he committed suicide in exile.

== Notes and references ==
- Old Book of Tang, vol. 73.
- New Book of Tang, vol. 98.
- Zizhi Tongjian, vols. 206, 209, 210.
