= Cen Xi =

Cen Xi (Chinese: 岑羲; died July 29, 713), courtesy name Bohua (伯華), was a Chinese historian and politician who served as an official during the Tang dynasty and the Wu Zhou dynasty. He was a chancellor during the reigns of Emperor Shang, Emperor Ruizong, and Emperor Xuanzong. He was known for his integrity as an official in charge of civil service affairs, but was later implicated as a partisan of Emperor Xuanzong's aunt Princess Taiping in 713 and was executed when Emperor Xuanzong suppressed Princess Taiping's party.

== Background ==
Cen Xi's grandfather Cen Wenben served as a chancellor during the reign of Emperor Taizong, and his father Cen Manqian (岑曼倩) served as the secretary general of the capital prefecture Yong Prefecture (雍州, roughly modern Xi'an, Shaanxi) and carried the title of Duke of Xi.

Cen Xi himself passed the imperial examinations sometime before 691 and served as Taichang Boshi (太常博士), an official at the ministry of worship. In 691, during the reign of Emperor Taizong's daughter-in-law (and one-time concubine) Wu Zetian, who had declared a new Zhou dynasty and interrupted Tang dynasty, Cen Xi's uncle Cen Changqian, (Note: Cen Changqian was actually a nephew—not a son—of Cen Wenben, but as Cen Changqian's father Cen Wenshu died early and Cen Changqian was raised by Cen Wenben, Cen Changqian was considered an uncle of Cen Xi's.) then a chancellor, was accused of treason and executed. As a result, Cen Xi was demoted to be a legal officer at Chen Prefecture (郴州, roughly modern Chenzhou, Hunan). He was subsequently made the magistrate of Jintan County. At that time, his brother Cen Zhongxiang (岑仲翔) was the magistrate of nearby Changzhou County (長洲, in modern Suzhou, Jiangsu) and another brother Cen Zhongxiu (岑仲休) was the magistrate of Lishui County (溧水, in modern Nanjing, Jiangsu). All three were known for their abilities in governance. The chancellor Zong Chuke, when an official was sent to examine the governance of the circuit containing those three counties, made the comment, "Do not forget about the three Cens east of the Yangtze River." He subsequently recommended Cen Xi, and Cen Xi was made the magistrate of Sishui County, near the capital Luoyang—which was considered a major promotion due to its location. (Note: As Zong Chuke served as chancellor twice during Wu Zetian's reign—697 to 698 and 704—the event must have occurred during one of those stints, and context implies that this occurred in 704.)

As of 704, Cen Xi was serving as the magistrate of Guangwu County (廣武—the new name for Sishui), when Wu Zetian asked the chancellors to recommend officials suitable for serving as low level officials in various ministries. The chancellor Wei Sili recommended Cen, but commented, "Alas, his uncle was Cen Changqian, and he suffers from the taint." Wu Zetian responded, "As long as he is capable, what taint can there be?" She therefore made Cen Tianguan Yuanwailang (天官員外郎), an official at the ministry of civil service affairs. It was said that based on Cen's precedent, thereafter family members of officials previously killed during Wu Zetian's reign were able to begin getting promoted.

== During Emperor Zhongzong's second reign ==
In 705, Wu Zetian was overthrown in a coup led by Zhang Jianzhi, Cui Xuanwei, Huan Yanfan, Jing Hui, and Yuan Shuji, and her son and crown prince Li Xian, a former emperor, was restored to the throne (as Emperor Zhongzong). However, Wu Zetian's nephew Wu Sansi the Prince of Liang soon became a lover of Emperor Zhongzong's powerful wife Empress Wei and a trusted advisor of Emperor Zhongzong's. When the five coup leaders subsequently wanted to submit a petition to Emperor Zhongzong to have the ranks of Wu Sansi and other Wu clan members reduced, initially, no one was daring to draft the petition for them, but Cen Xi, then serving as Zhongshu Sheren (中書舍人), a mid-level official at the Legislative Bureau, was willing to do so, and wrote an eloquent argument for the proposal. Later that year, after Wu Sansi was successful in having the five coup leaders removed from government, he had Cen made Mishu Shaojian (秘書少監), the deputy director of the Palace Library—an ostensibly honored position that carried little actual power. Eventually, he was made a deputy minister of civil service affairs (吏部侍郎, Libu Shilang) and was in charge of selecting officials, along with Cui Shi, Zheng Yin, and Li Yuangong (李元恭). Cui, Zheng, and Li were all known for corruption, but Cen was known for his integrity, during this time. Meanwhile, according to historical records that Cen himself later compiled, around this time, when Emperor Zhongzong's brother Li Dan the Prince of Xiang and sister Princess Taiping were implicated in a failed coup by Emperor Zhongzong's son and crown prince Li Chongjun in 707 in which Wu Sansi and his son Wu Chongxun (武崇訓) were killed, Cen and Xiao Zhizhong were the two officials who spoke on Li Dan's behalf, prompting Emperor Zhongzong to stop the investigation against Li Dan.

== During Emperor Shang's reign and Emperor Ruizong's second reign ==
In 710, Emperor Zhongzong died suddenly—a death that traditional historians believed to be a poisoning by Empress Wei and her daughter Li Guo'er the Princess Anle, so that Empress Wei could become "emperor" like Wu Zetian and Li Guo'er could be crown princess. Soon thereafter, before Emperor Zhongzong's death was announced, Empress Wei, as part of the governmental reorganization to consolidate her power, gave Cen Xi the designation Tong Zhongshu Menxia Pingzhangshi (同中書門下平章事), making him a de facto chancellor. (Note: Both Cen Xi's biographies in the Old Book of Tang and the New Book of Tang actually indicated that he was given the greater de facto chancellor designation of Tong Zhongshu Menxia Sanpin—"equivalent to the heads of the Legislative Bureau and Chancellery"—and at the same time made You Sanqi Changshi, a senior advisor at the legislative bureau, but the chronicles of Emperor Zhongzong's reign in those histories both indicated that Cen Xi remained as Zhongshu Sheren and was made Tong Zhongshu Menxia Pingzhangshi and the Zizhi Tongjian adopted the chronology and status of those versions of the events.) For the time being, Emperor Zhongzong's son by a concubine, Li Chongmao the Prince of Wen, was named emperor (as Emperor Shang), but Empress Wei retained power as empress dowager and regent. She sent a number of officials to survey the circuits, and Cen was sent to survey the Henan Circuit (河南道, roughly modern Henan and Shandong).

Less than a month later, Princess Taiping and Li Dan's son Li Longji the Prince of Linzi rose in rebellion and killed Empress Dowager Wei and Li Guo'er. Under their support, Li Dan, himself a former emperor, returned to the throne (as Emperor Ruizong), displacing Emperor Shang. Cen was made You Sanqi Changshi (右散騎常侍, a senior advisor at the legislative bureau) and minister of justice (刑部尚書, Xingbu Shangshu), and later demoted to be the prefect of Shan Prefecture (陝州, roughly modern Sanmenxia, Henan). He was, however, soon recalled to be the minister of census (戶部尚書, Hubu Shangshu). In 712, he was made chancellor de facto again, with the greater designation of Tong Zhongshu Menxia Sanpin (同中書門下三品). He was put in charge of editing the imperial history and also the register of clans. In editing the chronicles of Emperor Zhongzong's reign, he recorded how he and Xiao Zhizhong had spoken in Emperor Ruizong's defense when Li Chongjun's coup attempt occurred, and when Emperor Ruizong read the records, Emperor Ruizong thanked Cen and awarded him with silk and a good horse; Emperor Ruizong also made him Palace Attendant, the head of the Chancellery and a position automatically elevating him to chancellor status. Emperor Ruizong also created him the Duke of Nanyang.

At that time, Cen Xi's older brother Cen Xian (岑獻) was the deputy principal of the imperial university, and his younger brothers Cen Zhongxiang and Cen Zhongxiu were prefectural prefects. Some tens of his clan members were in fairly important positions. Cen Xi, at one point, sighed and commented, "When things become extreme, they will be reversed. This is what I am fearful of." He was fearful of what happened to the Cen clan and other officials during the earlier part of Wu Zetian's reign. However, he did not actually resign.

== During Emperor Xuanzong's reign ==
In 712, Emperor Ruizong passed the throne to Li Longji, who was then crown prince, and Li Longji took the throne as Emperor Xuanzong. At the suggestion of Princess Taiping, however, Emperor Ruizong retained power as Taishang Huang (retired emperor), and Princess Taiping continued to be influential through Emperor Ruizong, and the Emperor Ruizong often allowed her to exercise power on his behalf. Cen Xi was considered a member of her party. Later in 712, Emperor Xuanzong's associates, the chancellor Liu Youqiu and the general Zhang Wei (張暐), with Emperor Xuanzong's approval, planned to kill Cen and two other chancellors aligned with Princess Taiping -- Dou Huaizhen and Cui Shi—but the news was leaked after Zhang informed the plan to the official Deng Guangbin (鄧光賓). Liu, Zhang, and Deng were spared but exiled.

By 713, it was said that Princess Taiping, Dou, Cen, Xiao Zhizhong, Cui; along with other officials Xue Ji, Li Jin (李晉) the Prince of Xinxing (a grandson of Li Deliang (李德良), a cousin of Tang's founder Emperor Gaozu), Li You (李猷), Jia Yingfu (賈膺福), Tang Jun (唐晙); the generals Chang Yuankai (常元楷), Li Ci (李慈), and Li Qin (李欽); and the monk Huifan (惠範), were plotting to overthrow Emperor Xuanzong. It was further said that they discussed, with the lady in waiting Lady Yuan to poison the gastrodia elata that Emperor Xuanzong routinely took as an aphrodisiac. When this alleged plot was reported to Emperor Xuanzong by Wei Zhigu, Emperor Xuanzong, who had already received advice from Wang Ju (王琚), Zhang Shuo, and Cui Riyong to act first, did so. He convened a meeting with his brothers Li Fan (李範) the Prince of Qi, Li Ye (李業) the Prince of Xue, Guo Yuanzhen, along with a number of his associates — the general Wang Maozhong (王毛仲), the officials Jiang Jiao (姜皎) and Li Lingwen (李令問), his brother-in-law Wang Shouyi (王守一), the eunuch Gao Lishi, and the military officer Li Shoude (李守德) — and decided to act first. On July 29, Emperor Xuanzong had Wang Maozhong take 300 soldiers to the imperial guard camp to behead Chang and Li Ci. Then, Jia, Li You, Xiao, and Cen were arrested and executed as well. After his death, Cen's properties were confiscated.

== Son ==
- Cen Fu (岑敷), commoner
