= Wei Zhigu =

Wei Zhigu (Chinese: 魏知古; 647–715), posthumous name Duke Zhong of Liang (梁忠公), was an official of the Chinese Tang dynasty and Wu Zhou dynasty. He served as a chancellor during the reigns of Emperor Ruizong and Emperor Xuanzong.

== Background ==
Wei Zhigu was born in 647, during the reign of Emperor Taizong. His family was from Shen Prefecture (深州, in modern Hengshui, Hebei), but nothing else is known about his ancestors. In his youth, he was known for honesty and abilities, and he passed the imperial examinations. He was eventually made Zhuzuo Lang (著作郎), a low level official at the Palace Library, and was involved in editing imperial histories.

== During Wu Zetian's reign ==
During the Chang'an era of Emperor Taizong's daughter-in-law Wu Zetian (701–705), Wei Zhigu successively served as Fengge Sheren (鳳閣舍人)—a mid-level official at the legislative bureau of government (鳳閣, Fengge)—and deputy minister of military supplies (衛尉少卿, Weiwei Shaoqing). He was also made the military advisor to Wu Zetian's son Li Dan the Prince of Xiang.

== During Emperor Zhongzong's second reign ==
In 705, Wu Zetian was overthrown in a coup, and Li Dan's older brother Li Xian the Crown Prince, a former emperor, returned to the throne (as Emperor Zhongzong). Soon thereafter, Wei Zhigu was made deputy minister of civil service affairs (吏部尚書, Libu Shangshu) and was again responsible for editing imperial histories. He also soon received the honorific title Yinqing Guanglu Daifu (銀青光祿大夫). In 706, he left public service to observe a mourning period for his mother, but before the mourning period was over, he was recalled to serve as the prefect of Jin Prefecture (晉州, roughly modern Linfen, Shanxi).

== During Emperor Ruizong's second reign ==
In 710, Emperor Zhongzong died, and after power struggle at court, Li Dan, himself a former emperor, took the throne again (as Emperor Ruizong). On account of Wei Zhigu's previously having served him, he recalled Wei to the capital Chang'an to serve as Huangmen Shilang (黃門侍郎), the deputy head of the examination bureau (門下省, Menxia Sheng), and had him resume editing the imperial histories. In 711, he was made You Sanqi Changshi (右散騎常侍), a senior advisor at the legislative bureau (then named Zhongshu Sheng (中書省)). At that time, Emperor Ruizong was expending much funds and efforts to build Taoist temples for his daughters Princesses Jinxian and Yuzhen, who had become Taoist nuns. Wei wrote two earnestly-worded petitions asking that the projects be stopped. Emperor Ruizong did not accept them, but thanked him for his honesty and gave him the designation Tong Zhongshu Menxia Pingzhangshi (同中書門下平章事), making him a chancellor de facto. Also at that time, he was made Zuo Sanqi Changshi (左散騎常侍), moving him from the legislative bureau to the examination bureau. He was also made a member of the staff of Emperor Ruizong's crown prince Li Longji. Soon thereafter, he was made the minister of census (戶部尚書, Hubu Shangshu).

== During Emperor Xuanzong's reign ==
In 712, Emperor Ruizong passed the throne to Li Longji, who took the throne as Emperor Xuanzong, but Emperor Ruizong retained imperial powers as Taishang Huang (retired emperor). Soon thereafter, Wei Zhigu was made Palace Attendant, the head of the Chancellery and a default chancellor. In winter 712, when he accompanied Emperor Xuanzong on a hunt, he wrote a poem that suggested to Emperor Xuanzong that he should not hunt frequently, due to the expense and dangers involved. Emperor Xuanzong wrote an edict thanking him and awarding him with silk.

In 713, Wei was created the Duke of Liang. At that time, the power struggles between Emperor Xuanzong and his aunt Princess Taiping (Emperor Ruizong's sister) were coming to a head. It was said that Princess Taiping, Dou Huaizhen, Cen Xi, Xiao Zhizhong, Cui Shi; along with other officials Xue Ji, Li Jin (李晉) the Prince of Xinxing (a grandson of Li Deliang (李德良), a cousin of Tang's founder Emperor Gaozu), Li You (李猷), Jia Yingfu (賈膺福), Tang Jun (唐晙); the generals Chang Yuankai (常元楷), Li Ci (李慈), and Li Qin (李欽); and the monk Huifan (惠範), were plotting to overthrow Emperor Xuanzong. It was further said that they discussed, with the lady in waiting Lady Yuan to poison the gastrodia elata that Emperor Xuanzong routinely took as an aphrodisiac. When this alleged plot was reported to Emperor Xuanzong by Wei, Emperor Xuanzong, who had already received advice from Wang Ju (王琚), Zhang Shuo, and Cui Riyong to act first, did so. He convened a meeting with his brothers Li Fan (李範) the Prince of Qi, Li Ye (李業) the Prince of Xue, Guo, along with a number of his associates—the general Wang Maozhong (王毛仲), the officials Jiang Jiao (姜皎) and Li Lingwen (李令問), his brother-in-law Wang Shouyi (王守一), the eunuch Gao Lishi, and the military officer Li Shoude (李守德)—and decided to act first. On July 29, Emperor Xuanzong had Wang Maozhong take 300 soldiers to the imperial guard camp to behead Chang and Li Ci. Then, Jia, Li You, Xiao, and Cen were arrested and executed as well. Dou and Princess Taiping committed suicide. When Emperor Ruizong heard about the incident, he ascended the tower at Chengtian Gate (承天門) to try to ascertain what was happening, and it was Guo who informed him what happened. Emperor Ruizong subsequently yieldedpowers to Emperor Xuanzong and no longer actively participated in policy decisions thereafter. For Wei's contributions, Emperor Xuanzong enlarged his fief and awarded him with silk. In winter 713, Wei went to the eastern capital Luoyang to carry out a selection process for officials there, and was considered to have done an exceptional job, drawing praises from Emperor Xuanzong. As Emperor Xuanzong carried out major revisions of names of official titles and offices in 713, Wei's title as the head of the examination bureau was changed to Huangmen Jian (黃門監), as the bureau itself was renamed Huangmen Sheng (黃門省).

That trip to Luoyang, however, would indirectly lead to Wei's fall. By this point, Yao Chong, who had previously served as Wei's superior during Wu Zetian's reign, was again chancellor and was well-trusted by Emperor Xuanzong. While Wei was in Luoyang, two of Yao's sons, then serving as officials at Luoyang, were accepting bribes and using their father's connections with Wei to make requests of Wei, displeasing Wei. Further, Yao aggravated Wei by having Song Jing review the decisions that Wei made while at Luoyang. After Wei returned to Chang'an, he reported what had happened with Yao's sons in Luoyang. Emperor Xuanzong summoned Yao, initially ready to question him, but Yao realized what had happened and preemptively reported on his sons, implying that his sons had only dared to make requests of Wei because of Yao's own good treatment of Wei when Wei was a subordinate. Emperor Xuanzong, now believing that Wei was ungrateful, wanted to remove Wei, but ultimately only demoted Wei to be the minister of public works (工部尚書, Gongbu Shangshu), no longer a chancellor. Wei died in 715.
