= Emperor Xuanzong of Tang =

Emperor of the Tang dynasty from 713 to 756

Emperor Xuanzong of Tang 唐玄宗
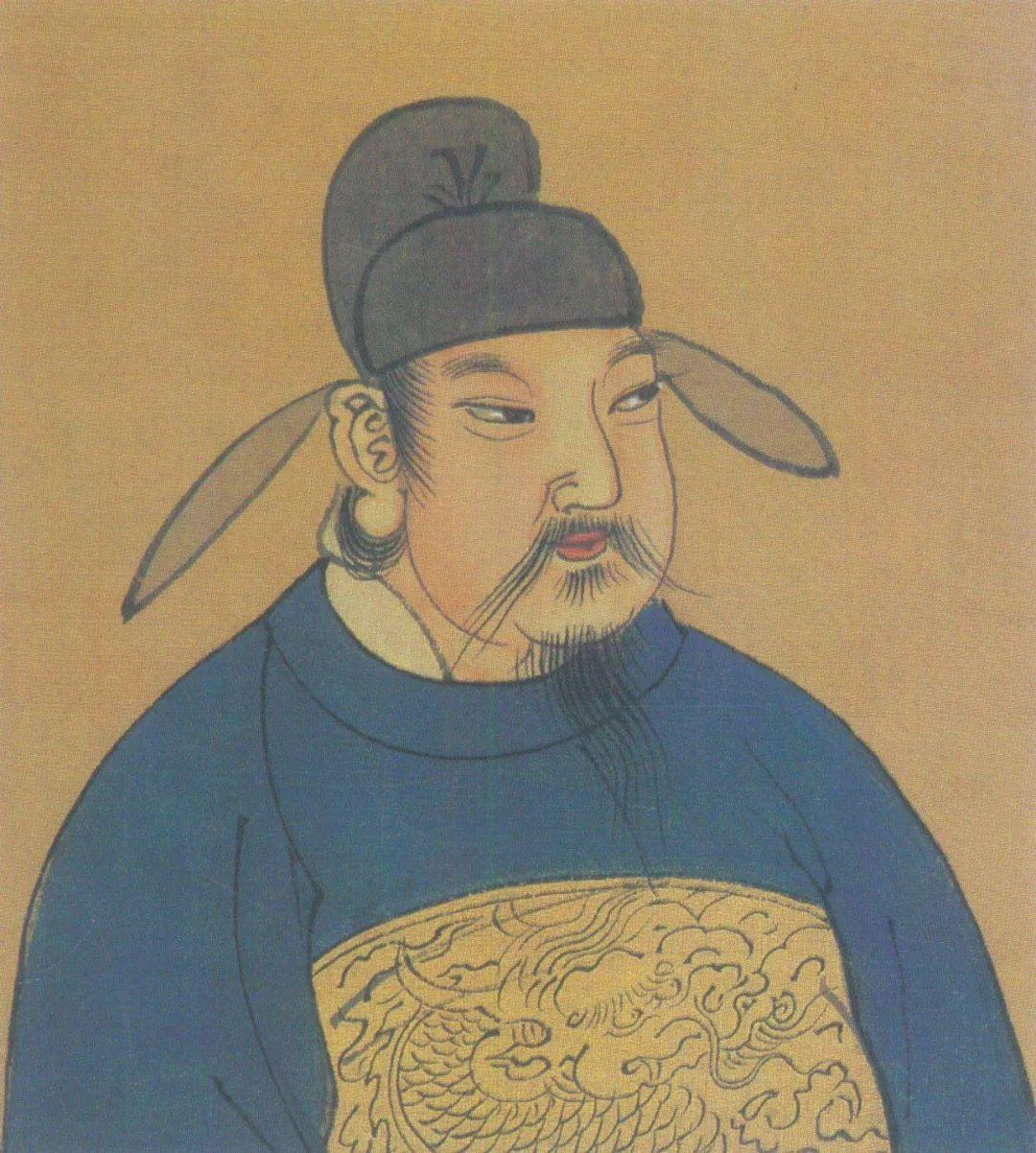
- Ming Dynasty portrait of Emperor Xuanzong

Emperor of the Tang dynasty
- Reign: 8 September 712 – 12 August 756
- Predecessor: Emperor Ruizong
- Successor: Emperor Suzong
- Born: 8 September 685; Luoyang, Tang dynasty
- Died: 3 May 762 (aged 76); Chang'an, Tang dynasty
- Consorts: Empress Wang (m. 693; died 725); Empress Zhenshun (died 737); Empress Yuanxian (m. 710; died 729)
Names
- Family name: Li (李); Given name: Longji (隆基)
Era dates
- Xiantian (先天; 712–713); Kaiyuan (開元; 713–741); Tianbao (天寶; 742–756)
Regnal name
- Emperor Kaiyuan Shengwen Shenwu (開元聖文神武皇帝)
Posthumous name
- Emperor Zhidao Dasheng Daming Xiao (至道大聖大明孝皇帝)
Temple name
- Xuanzong (玄宗)
- House: Li
- Dynasty: Tang
- Father: Emperor Ruizong
- Mother: Empress Zhaocheng
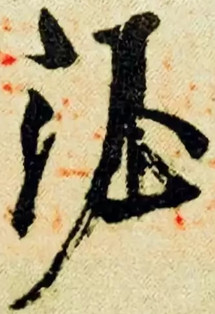
- Huaya

Emperor Xuanzong of Tang
- "Xuanzong of Tang" in Chinese characters
- Chinese: 唐玄宗
Transcriptions
Standard Mandarin
- Hanyu Pinyin: Táng Xuánzōng
- Gwoyeu Romatzyh: Tarng Shyuantzong
- Wade–Giles: Tʻang^{2} Hsüan^{2}-tsung^{1}
- IPA: [tʰǎŋ ɕɥɛ̌n.tsʊ́ŋ]
Yue: Cantonese
- Jyutping: Tong4 Jyun4zung1
Middle Chinese
- Middle Chinese: dang ɦwen-tswong

Tang Minghuang (Note: Li Longji was given this name during the Qing dynasty as his temple name "Xuanzong" violated the naming taboo of the Kangxi Emperor, whose given name is "Xuanye".)
- Chinese: 唐明皇
Transcriptions
Standard Mandarin
- Hanyu Pinyin: Táng Mínghuáng
- Gwoyeu Romatzyh: Tarng Minghwang
- Wade–Giles: Tʻang^{2} Ming^{2}-huang^{2}
Middle Chinese
- Middle Chinese: dang mjæng-ɦwang

Li Longji
- Chinese: 李隆基
Transcriptions
Standard Mandarin
- Hanyu Pinyin: Lǐ Lóngjī
- Gwoyeu Romatzyh: Lii Longji
- Wade–Giles: Li^{3} Lung^{2}-chi^{1}
Middle Chinese
- Middle Chinese: lɨX lɨung-kɨ

Third alternative Chinese name
- Chinese: 明皇帝
Transcriptions
Standard Mandarin
- Hanyu Pinyin: Míng Huángdì
- Gwoyeu Romatzyh: Ming Hwangdih
- Wade–Giles: Ming^{2} Huang^{2}-ti^{4}
Middle Chinese
- Middle Chinese: mjæng ɦwang-teiH

Li Sanlang
- Chinese: 李三郎
Transcriptions
Standard Mandarin
- Hanyu Pinyin: Lǐ Sānláng
- Gwoyeu Romatzyh: Lii Sanlang
- Wade–Giles: Li^{3} San^{1}-lang^{2}
Middle Chinese
- Middle Chinese: lɨX sam-lang

Emperor Xuanzong of Tang ([ɕɥɛ̌n.tsʊ́ŋ]; 8 September 685 (Note: General note: Dates given here are in the Julian calendar. They are not in the proleptic Gregorian calendar.) – 3 May 762), personal name Li Longji, was the ninth emperor of the Tang dynasty of China, reigning from 712 to 756. His reign of 44 years was the longest during the Tang dynasty. Through two palace coups, he seized the throne and inherited an empire still in its golden age. He was initially assisted by capable chancellors like Yao Chong, Song Jing and Zhang Yue who were already serving as government officials before Xuanzong ascended the throne. Under Emperor Xuanzong, the empire reached its turning point and went into sharp decline and near collapse, due to political missteps, such as over-trusting chancellors Li Linfu, Yang Guozhong and general An Lushan, with Tang's golden age ending in the An Lushan rebellion.

== Background ==
Li Longji was born at the Tang dynasty eastern capital Luoyang in 685, during the first reign of his father Emperor Ruizong (Li Dan) – but at that time, Emperor Ruizong's mother Empress Dowager Wu (later known as Wu Zetian), not Emperor Ruizong, was in actual control of power as empress dowager and regent. Li Longji was the third son of Emperor Ruizong, and his mother was Emperor Ruizong's concubine Consort Dou, who was highly ranked in the bureaucracy. In 687, as the emperor's son, he was created the Prince of Chu. It was said that he was handsome, with an appearance that was "majestic and beautiful", and was talented in music. He had two older brothers – Li Chengqi, born of Emperor Ruizong's wife Empress Liu, and Li Chengyi (李成義), as well as three younger brothers – Li Longfan (李隆範), Li Longye (李隆業), and Li Longti (李隆悌). He had two full younger sisters, Princess Jinxian (金仙公主) and Princess Yuzhen (玉真公主), who later became Taoist nuns.

== During Wu Zetian's reign ==
In 690, Empress Dowager Wu had her son Emperor Ruizong yield the throne to her, and she took the throne as empress regnant of a new Zhou dynasty, interrupting Tang. She imposed upon Ruizong and his family the surname Wu (武) to match hers. In 692, Li Longji and his brothers were allowed to have residences outside the palace and were given staffs at their mansions. In 693, both his mother Consort Dou and Li Dan's wife Crown Princess Liu (Note: Li Dan was demoted to crown prince at that point.) were killed by Wu Zetian inside the palace after Wu Zetian's lady-in-waiting Wei Tuan'er (韋團兒) falsely accused them of using witchcraft against Wu Zetian – and not even their bodies were recovered. Subsequently, all of Li Dan's sons were reduced in title, and Li Longji's title was reduced to Prince of Linzi. He and his brothers, along with their cousins Li Guangshun (李光順) the Prince of Yifeng, Li Shouli the Prince of Yong, and Li Shouyi (李守義) the Prince of Yong'an, (Note: sons of their uncle Li Xián, formerly crown prince but who had been forced by Wu Zetian to commit suicide in 684) were kept inside the palace and not allowed to have contact with outsiders until 699, when they were allowed to leave the palace and take up residences outside.

== During Emperor Zhongzong's second reign: under Empress Wei's shadow ==
In 705, Wu Zetian was overthrown in a coup (Shenlong Coup), and Li Longji's uncle Li Xiǎn (note different person than the father of Li Guangshun, Li Shouli, and Li Shouyi), who was at that time crown prince (Li Dan having yielded that title to him in 698 and taken the title of Prince of Xiang), who had been briefly emperor prior to Li Dan, returned to the throne (as Emperor Zhongzong). Li Longji was made the deputy minister of military supplies (衛尉少卿, Weiwei Shaoqing). In 708, he was made the secretary general of Lu Prefecture (潞州, roughly modern Changzhi, Shanxi). In 710, he was recalled to the capital Chang'an to attend to Emperor Zhongzong when Emperor Zhongzong was sacrificing to heaven and earth. Meanwhile, sorcerers engaged by Emperor Zhongzong believed that there was an aura of an emperor at the area of Chang'an where the mansions Li Longji and his uncles were, and Emperor Zhongzong tried to fulfill the vision by visiting Li Longji's mansion and attending a feast there. While Li Longji was back in Chang'an, he spent time to cultivate relationships with imperial guard commanders, as he believed that Emperor Zhongzong's powerful wife Empress Wei, who was in charge of government affairs, would bring harm to the Tang dynasty.

== Coup against Empress Dowager Wei ==
In summer 710, Emperor Zhongzong died suddenly—a death that traditional historians believed to be a poisoning by Empress Wei and her daughter Li Guo'er the Princess Anle so that Empress Wei could become "emperor" like Wu Zetian and Li Guo'er could become crown princess. For the time being, Emperor Zhongzong's son by a concubine, Li Chongmao the Prince of Wen, was named emperor (as Emperor Shang), but Empress Wei retained actual power as empress dowager and regent. Originally, Empress Dowager Wei's clan members, along with Zong, Li Guo'er's husband Wu Yanxiu, and other officials Zhao Lüwen (趙履溫) and Ye Jingneng (葉靜能) were advising her to take the throne, like Wu Zetian did, and they also advised her to eliminate Li Dan and Princess Taiping. The official Cui Riyong leaked their plan to Li Longji. Li Longji responded by conspiring with Princess Taiping, Princess Taiping's son Xue Chongjian (薛崇簡), as well as several low-level officials close to him—Zhong Shaojing, Wang Chongye (王崇曄), Liu Youqiu, and Ma Sizong (麻嗣宗)—to act first. Meanwhile, Empress Wei's nephews Wei Bo (韋播) and Gao Song (高嵩), who had recently been put in command of imperial guards and who had tried to establish their authority by dealing with the guards harshly, had alienated the guards, and the guard officers Ge Fushun (葛福順), Chen Xuanli (陳玄禮), and Li Xianfu (李仙鳧) thereafter also joined the plot.

Without first informing Li Dan, the conspirators enacted their plan on 21 July 710, first killing Wei Bo, Gao, and Empress Wei's cousin Wei Gui (韋璿). They then began their attack on the palace, causing Empress Dowager Wei to flee to an imperial guard camp, where a guard beheaded her. Li Guo'er, Wu Yanxiu, and Lady Helou were killed as well. Li Longji soon slaughtered a number of officials in Empress Dowager's faction as well as her clan, while displaying Empress Dowager Wei's body on the street. At the urging of Princess Taiping, Li Longji, and Li Longji's brother Li Chengqi, Li Dan soon took the throne from Li Chongmao and again became emperor (as Emperor Ruizong).

== During Emperor Ruizong's second reign: under Princess Taiping's shadow ==
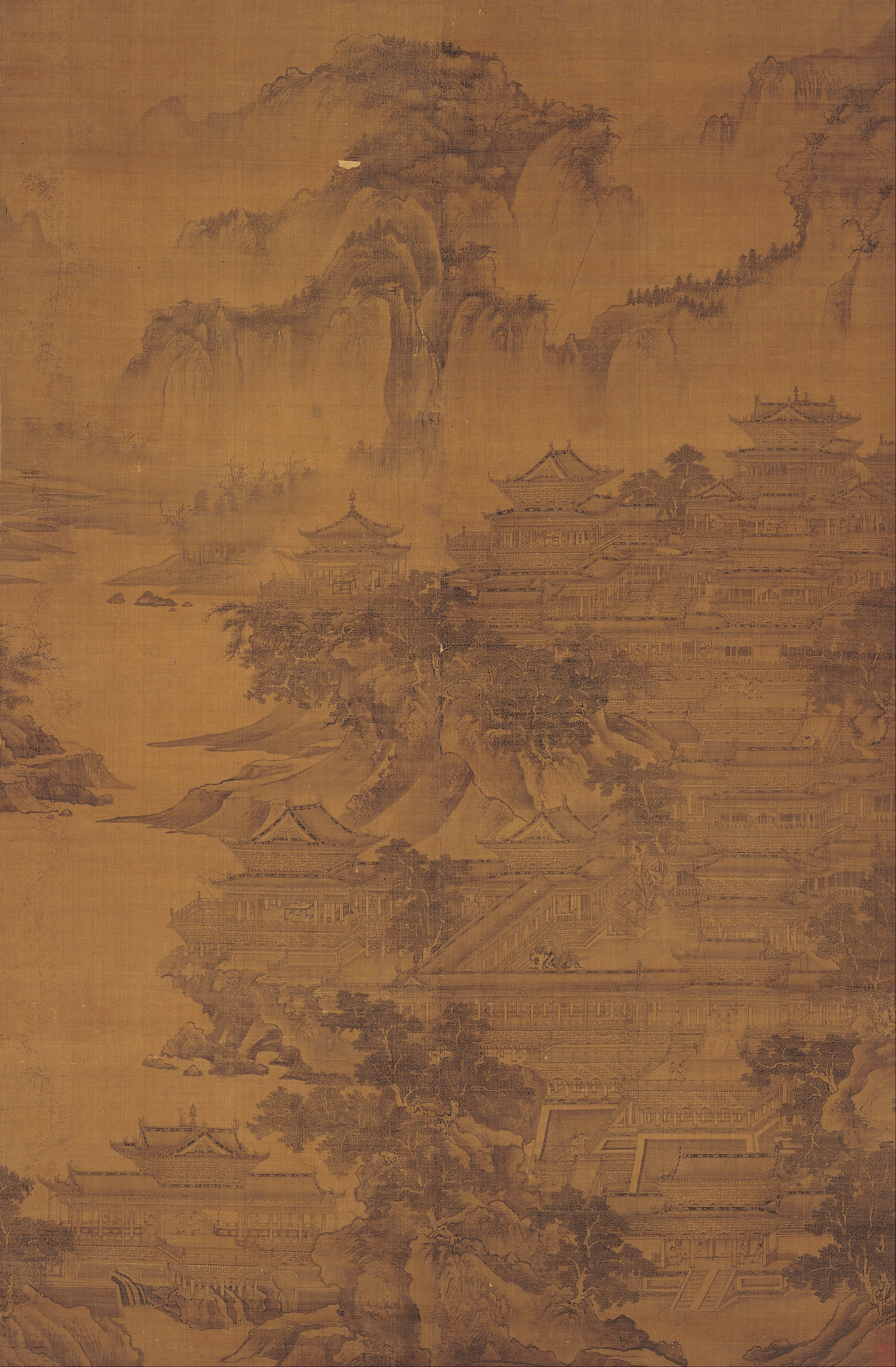
The Summer Palace of Emperor Ming (Xuanzong), as imagined by painter Guo Zhongshu (929–977 CE)

Emperor Ruizong once again ascended to the throne, which is different from the first time he was a puppet. This time he truly mastered the power and quickly used it handily. Emperor Ruizong was immediately faced with the issue of whom to make crown prince—as Li Chengqi, as the oldest son overall and the oldest son of his wife, was the appropriate heir under Confucian principles of succession, but Li Longji had been the one whose accomplishments had allowed him to retake the throne. He hesitated. Li Chengqi declined consideration to be crown prince—stating to his father:

If the state were secure, then consideration should be first given to the oldest son of the wife. If the state were in danger, then consideration should be first given for achievement. If you did not follow this principle, the people of the entire empire will be disappointed. I would rather die than to be placed above the Prince of Ping. (Note: i.e., Li Longji, whose title had been changed to Prince of Ping by this point)

Li Chengqi wept and begged to yield for several days, and after further persuasion by the chancellor Liu Youqiu—who had been part of Li Longji's coup plans—Emperor Ruizong agreed and created Li Longji crown prince. Li Longji submitted a petition offering to yield to Li Chengqi, but Emperor Ruizong rejected it. After he came to the throne, whenever the chancellors and officials discussed political affairs with him, the first sentence he asked was: "Have you ever discussed with Princess Taiping? "If the answer is yes, he will continue to ask: "Have you ever discussed with Li Longji?" If both people have clear opinions, he will make a decision based on this, as a result, he relies heavily on Princess Taiping and Li Longji. Because of his achievements, having the crown prince title and the emperor's trust, Li Longji was active and powerful in the politics of Emperor Ruizong's reign, but, also, whenever Emperor Ruizong called a court meeting, Princess Taiping would listen to the courtiers' conversations with the emperor about the government behind a pearl curtain and had the government under her hands.

Under her ample reputation in the previous reigns, her great achievements in two coups, the trust of Emperor Ruizong's, the vast privileges, attention, independence and wealth that Emperor Ruizong bestowed on her, and having countless allies, Princess Taiping has decision-making power on many serious events in the court and the country matters and was so powerful that she even surpassed Emperor Ruizong. She could often decide the promotion or demotion, deportation or summons of officials with a single sentence, and if the subject was undecided, it was changed or determined by a sentence from her, so most chancellors, forbidden troops, civil and military officials, regional warlords and senior servants of the Imperial palace were her associates. Initially, Princess Taiping agreed to Li Longji's ascension as crown prince despite the fact that Li Longji was not Emperor Ruizong's oldest son and was not born of Emperor Ruizong's wife Empress Liu (Note: Li Chengqi was both—and therefore pursuant to Confucian principles of succession should have been crown prince.) as she believed that Li Longji was young (Note: Li Longji was not quite 25 years old at the time he was made crown prince. When Li was made taizi differs across different sources, as noted by Sima Guang in his Zizhi Tongjian Kaoyi. Sima indicated that the Ruizong Lu (《睿宗录》), Emperor Ruizong's and Xuanzong's biographies in the edition of the Old Book of Tang which he reviewed all recorded that Li was made taizi on the bingwu day of the 6th month of the 1st year of the Jingyun era of Emperor Ruizong's reign (correspond to 27 July 710 in the Julian calendar); Tongjian adopted the account found in Taishang Huang Lu, which recorded the date as the dingwei day of that month (28 July 710). Other editions of the Old Book of Tang recorded the date as the jisi day of the 7th month of that year (19 Aug 710), while Ruizong's biography in the New Book of Tang recorded the date as the dingwei day of the 6th month of that year.) and would be easy to control. However, once she began to see that Li Longji was strong-willed and criticized her influences, she became apprehensive and often had officials close to her publicly opine that Li Longji was an improper crown prince. She even spread rumors throughout the empire and tried to cause discontent among the common people, saying: Li Longji is not the eldest son of the emperor, so he should not become the crown prince. She further often paid Li Longji's staff members to spy on him to try to find faults with him. She associated with a group of officials, including the chancellors Dou Huaizhen, Xiao Zhizhong, and Cen Xi, intending to find some way to remove Li Longji, but was unable to get two other chancellors—Wei Anshi and Song Jing—to join her group. When Princess Taiping tried to depose Li Longji in two actions, one with Emperor Ruizong himself and another time by summoning the chancellors at Xuanwu Gate and publicly accusing Li Longji of treason or incompetence, but it did not achieve the desired result.

In 711, Song and another chancellor, Yao Yuanzhi, tried to persuade Emperor Ruizong to carry out a plan that they believed would end her plotting and influence. They proposed that the two princes who arguably had superior claims on the throne than Li Longji—Li Chengqi and Li Shouli (whose father Li Xian (note different character than Emperor Zhongzong) was an older brother to both Emperors Zhongzong and Ruizong)—be sent out of the capital Chang'an to serve as prefectural prefects, while Princess Taiping and Wu Youji be sent to live in Luoyang. They also proposed that Li Longji be put in charge of most affairs of state. Emperor Ruizong initially agreed and made the orders as Song and Yao suggested, except that he believed that Luoyang was too far and therefore sent Princess Taiping and Wu Youji only to Pu Prefecture (蒲州, roughly modern Yuncheng, Shanxi). After Princess Taiping found out that the plan was conceived by Song and Yao, however, she was incensed and let Li Longji know her anger, and she mobilized her group to attack Song and Yao and oppose Emperor Ruizong's decision. In fear, Li Longji submitted a petition accusing Song and Yao of alienating him from his brothers Li Chengqi and Li Shouli (who was actually a cousin but was raised with Emperor Ruizong's sons) and aunt Princess Taiping, asking that the two be put to death. Emperor Ruizong, in response, demoted Song and Yao and recalled Princess Taiping, Li Chengqi, and Li Shouli to the capital. In the aftermaths, Li Longji submitted another request to yield the crown prince position to Li Chengqi, but Emperor Ruizong declined it. Also in 711, Emperor Ruizong posthumously honored both Empress Liu and Li Longji's mother Consort Dou as empresses and built a temple for them to be worshipped, but was unable to locate their bodies for reburial, and therefore had to give them a ceremonial reburial without the bodies. But this posthumous honor for Li Longji's mother further displeased Princess Taiping. Emperor Ruizong also ordered that all minor matters be decided by Li Longji, and with this, Emperor Ruizong established Li Longji as his sole successor, but diverted his participation in important matters and focused more on the advice of his sister, Princess Taiping.

By winter 711 Princess Taiping had become even more powerful than before. Because of her recommendations, Emperor Ruizong carried out a major reorganization of his administration, relieving the chancellors Wei, Guo Yuanzhen, Dou, Li Rizhi, and Zhang Yue of their chancellor positions, instead commissioning a number of chancellors that she recommended — Liu Youqiu, Wei Zhigu, Cui Shi, and Lu Xiangxian. (Cui was a lover of Princess Taiping, and when she offered to recommend him as chancellor, because he admired Lu, he requested to be made chancellor along with Lu, even though Lu was not an associate of Princess Taiping. It was said that Emperor Ruizong, however, was initially unwilling to make Cui chancellor, but relented after Princess Taiping begged in tears, although the account may be somewhat discountable in that neither Liu nor Wei was an associate of Princess Taiping either, and both were close associates of Li Longji.)

In 712, Princess Taiping had astrologers warn Emperor Ruizong that the constellation that symbolized the imperial throne, Dizuo (帝座), showed that there would be a change in the emperor's position—believing that Emperor Ruizong would suspect Li Longji of plotting a coup and that she could remove Li Longji this way. Instead, Emperor Ruizong, reasoning that the change in the emperor's position could be accounted by an orderly transition, offered to pass the throne to Li Longji. Princess Taiping fervently opposed it, and Li Longji initially declined, but at Emperor Ruizong's insistence finally accepted and took the throne on 8 September (as Emperor Xuanzong). However, at Princess Taiping's suggestion, Emperor Ruizong retained much of the imperial power as Taishang Huang (retired emperor), therefore, he assumed strategic authority, and his edicts continued to carry greater force than Emperor Xuanzong's.

== As emperor ==
=== Xiantian era (712–713) ===
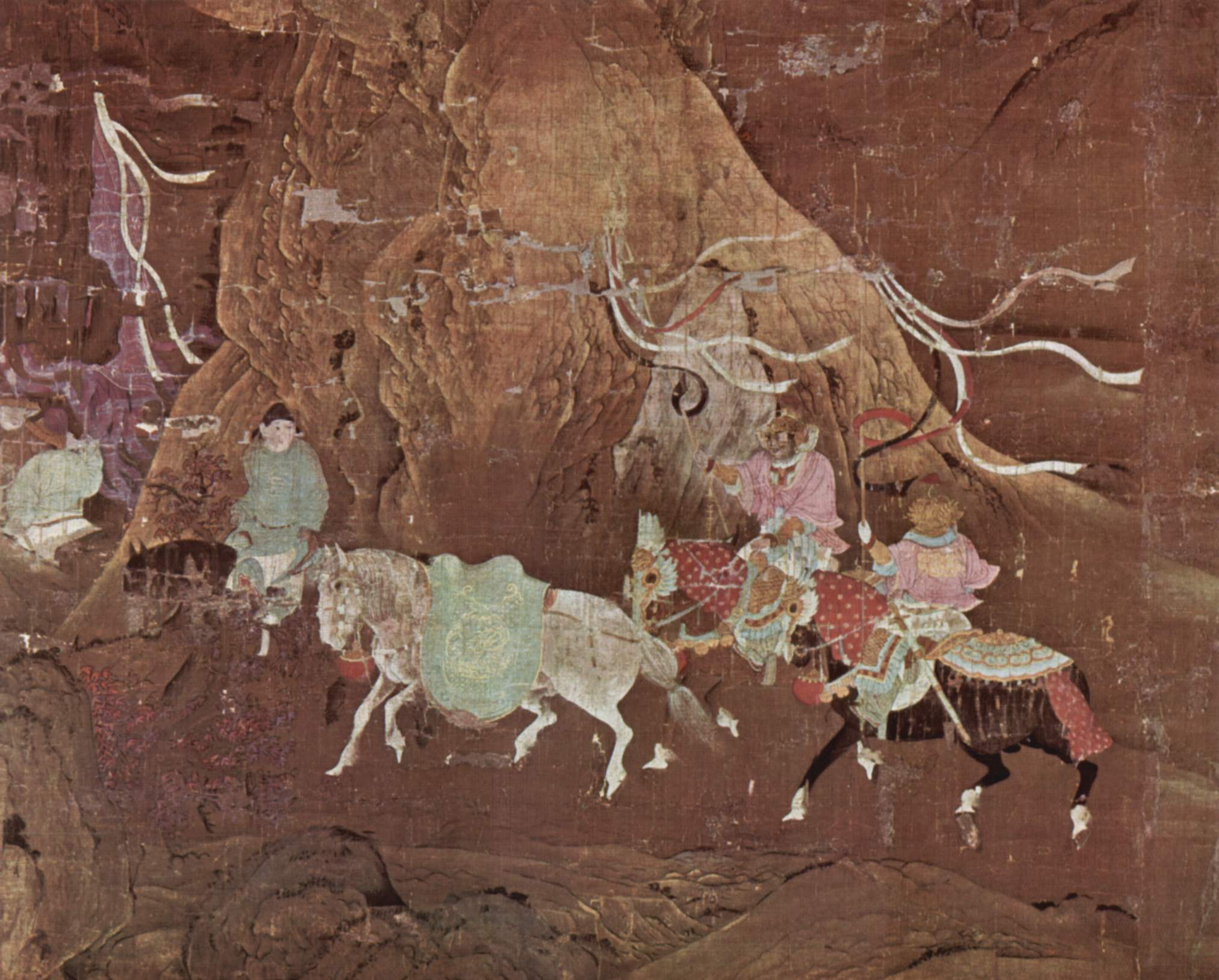
A Tributary Horse for Emperor Xuanzong, painted in the 12th century during the subsequent Song dynasty

Emperor Xuanzong made his wife Crown Princess Wang empress. Meanwhile, Princess Taiping continued to be listening to politics with curtains in the court, highly extremely influential in governmental matters through Emperor Ruizong, the group of chancellors openly frequented her house and most chancellors, forbidden troops, officials and warlords were her associates. (Of the seven chancellors at the time, five – Dou Huaizhen, Xiao Zhizhong, Cen Xi, Cui Shi, and Lu Xiangxian – were made chancellors at her recommendation, although Lu was not considered a member of her party.) As a result, the war between her and him continued more seriously. Liu Youqiu and the general Zhang Wei (張暐), with Emperor Xuanzong's approval, planned to mobilize the imperial guards to kill several of those chancellors – Dou Huaizhen, Cui Shi and Cen Xi. However, after Zhang told the plan to the imperial censor Deng Guangbin (鄧光賓), the news was leaked. At the request of Princess Taiping's, Emperor Ruizong issued an order to arrested Liu, and initially set to be executed. But Emperor Xuanzong interceded on his behalf with Emperor Ruizong, and Liu, Zhang, and Deng were spared but exiled.

Later in 712, in one of Princess Taiping's plans to oust him, at her request, Emperor Ruizong decreed that Emperor Xuanzong lead a group of soldiers to examine the northern border. However, the group of conscripted soldiers was disbanded in spring 713, and the plan was never carried out.

By summer 713, it was said that Princess Taiping, Dou, Cen, Xiao, Cui; along with other officials Xue Ji, Li Jin (李晉) the Prince of Xinxing (a grandson of Li Deliang (李德良), a cousin of Tang's founder Emperor Gaozu), Li You (李猷), Jia Yingfu (賈膺福), Tang Jun (唐晙); the generals Chang Yuankai (常元楷), Li Ci (李慈), and Li Qin (李欽); and the monk Huifan, were plotting to overthrow Emperor Xuanzong. It was further said that they discussed, with the lady-in-waiting Lady Yuan, to poison the gastrodia elata that Emperor Xuanzong routinely took as an aphrodisiac. When this alleged plot was reported to Emperor Xuanzong by Wei Zhigu, Emperor Xuanzong, who had already received advice from Wang Ju (王琚), Zhang Shuo, and Cui Riyong to act first, did so. He convened a meeting with his brothers Li Longfan the Prince of Qi and Li Longye the Prince of Xue (who had changed their names to Li Fan and Li Ye by this point to observe naming taboo for Emperor Xuanzong), Guo Yuanzhen, along with a number of his associates – the general Wang Maozhong (王毛仲), the officials Jiang Jiao (姜皎) and Li Lingwen (李令問), his brother-in-law Wang Shouyi (王守一), the eunuch Gao Lishi, and the military officer Li Shoude (李守德) – and decided to act first. On 29 July, Emperor Xuanzong had Wang Maozhong take 300 soldiers to the imperial guard camp to behead Chang and Li Ci. Then, Jia, Li You, Xiao, and Cen were arrested and executed as well. Dou fled into a canyon and committed suicide by hanging. Xue Ji was forced to commit suicide. When Emperor Ruizong heard about this, he quickly ascended the tower at Chengtian Gate (承天門) to ascertain what was happening. Guo reported to him Emperor Xuanzong's intentions, and Emperor Ruizong felt compelled to affirm Emperor Xuanzong's actions in an edict. The next day, on 30 July, Emperor Ruizong issued an edict transferring all authorities to Emperor Xuanzong. Meanwhile, Princess Taiping, hearing what happened to her associates, fled into a temple in the mountains, only appearing three days later. Emperor Ruizong asked Emperor Xuanzong for her pardon, but he refused. Emperor Xuanzong ordered her to commit suicide at home, and put to death her sons and associates, except for Xue Chongjian. Princess Taiping's assets were confiscated, and it was said that there was so much treasure, livestock, and real estate that it took several years: more than thirty years for the accounting to be complete. Emperor Ruizong moved to a secondary palace, Baifu Hall (百福殿) and would remain there until his death in 716.

=== Kaiyuan era (713–741) ===
Emperor Xuanzong's Kaiyuan era is usually viewed as one of the golden ages of Chinese history – a period of political stability, peace in society, and economic prosperity, in addition to advances in education, literature, music, painting, sculpture, and religion.

==== Early Kaiyuan era ====
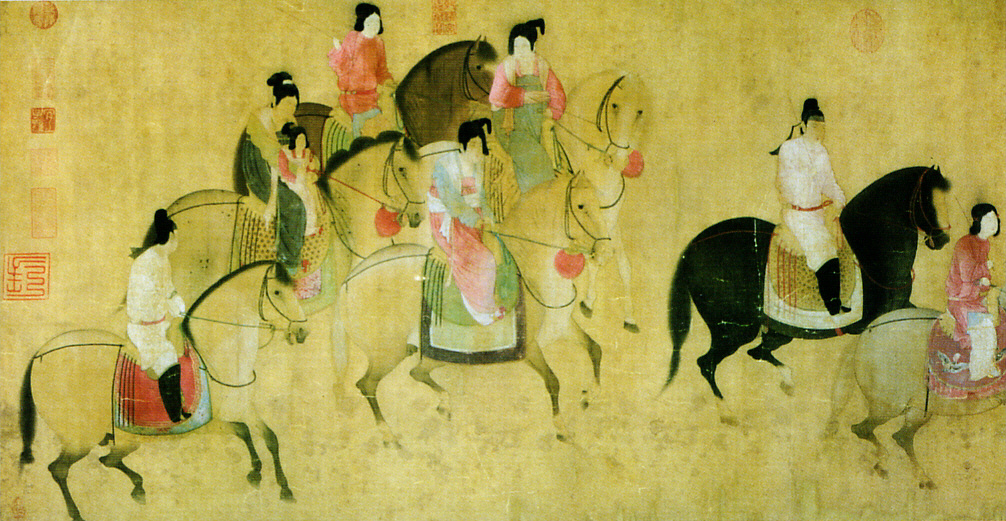
Spring Outing of the Tang Court, by Xuanzong era artist Zhang Xuan, 8th century original

Meanwhile, Zhang Yue and Liu Youqiu served as chancellors, but they were soon displaced by Yao Yuanzhi (who then changed his name to Yao Chong) and Lu Huaishen. Changing the system of having a large group of chancellors simultaneous, as had been the case throughout Tang, Emperor Xuanzong reduced the numbers to two (or sometimes three) for the rest of his reign. Yao was considered a highly capable administrator, and with him ruling on most important matters and Lu assisting, the government was said to be highly efficient.

In 714, Emperor Xuanzong carried out a series of political reprisals against the cruel secret police officials of Wu Zetian's reign, exiling the ones that were still alive and eventually barring their descendants from holding political offices. At the urging of Jiang Jiao's brother Jiang Hui (姜誨), he also exiled a number of chancellors – Wei Sili, Wei Anshi, Zhao Yanzhao, and Li Jiao – from Emperor Zhongzong's reign whom Jiang accused of being unable to curb Empress Wei's abuse of power.

Also in 714, Emperor Xuanzong, wanting to punish the Khitan and the Xi for having defeated Tang forces during Emperor Zhongzong's reign, commissioned the general Xue Ne to attack them, but Xue suffered another devastating loss to them, at the casualty rate of 80–90%. However, later in the year, when the Tibetan Empire attacked, Emperor Xuanzong again commissioned Xue to defend against the attack, and Xue was able to repel the Tibetan forces. Subsequently, though, although both sides tried to invoke the marriage between Li Shouli's daughter Princess Jincheng and Me Agtsom, emperor of the Tibetan Empire, in seeking peace, the two sides could not reach an agreement and remained in border conflict yearly. In response, Emperor Xuanzong established the office of jiedushi (military governor) of Longyou Circuit (隴右, headquartered in what is now Haidong, Qinghai), with a centralized command of 12 prefectures under a single military general. Eventually, the establishment of jiedushi would be extended to other parts of the empire.

Also in 714, Emperor Xuanzong created Li Siqian, his second son and the son of his then-favorite concubine Consort Zhao, crown prince. (Emperor Xuanzong's wife Empress Wang was sonless.)

Meanwhile, the Tang relationship with Qapaghan Qaghan of the Göktürks had fluctuated during the first few years of the Kaiyuan era, as minor hostilities occurred at the borders as well as contests over vassals' loyalty for the two states, but they were also at times friendly to each other, with Qapaghan requesting at times to marry a Tang princess and Emperor Xuanzong agreeing to the proposal. In 716, however, Qapaghan was killed in battle against the Bayegu (拔野古), and from that point on, lacking his efficient leadership, the Göktürks, while remaining an important regional power, posed much less of a threat to China, although at times still capable of dealing serious defeats to Tang forces, as was the case in 720 when the Göktürk general Tonyukuk defeated the Tang garrison at Liang Prefecture (涼州, roughly modern Wuwei, Gansu) and the Tang vassal Basmyl. Meanwhile, Tang, the Tibetan Empire, and the Umayyad Caliphate were constantly engaging in a three-way tug of war for influence in the Xiyu (i.e., modern Xinjiang and former Soviet Central Asia) region. In 715, for example, when the king of Bahanna (拔汗那) was expelled by a new king supported by the Tibetan Empire and the Umayyad Caliphate, Tang forces commanded by the general Zhang Xiaosong (張孝嵩) attacked the new king and restored the old king. General Tang Jiahui led the Chinese to defeat the following Arab-Tibetan attack in the Battle of Aksu (717). The attack on Aksu was joined by Turgesh Khan Suluk. Both Uch Turfan and Aksu were attacked by the Turgesh, Arab, and Tibetan force on 15 August 717. Qarluqs serving under Chinese command, under Arsila Xian, a Western Turkic Qaghan serving under the Chinese Assistant Grand Protector General Tang Jiahui defeated the attack. Al-Yashkuri, the Arab commander and his army fled to Tashkent after they were defeated.

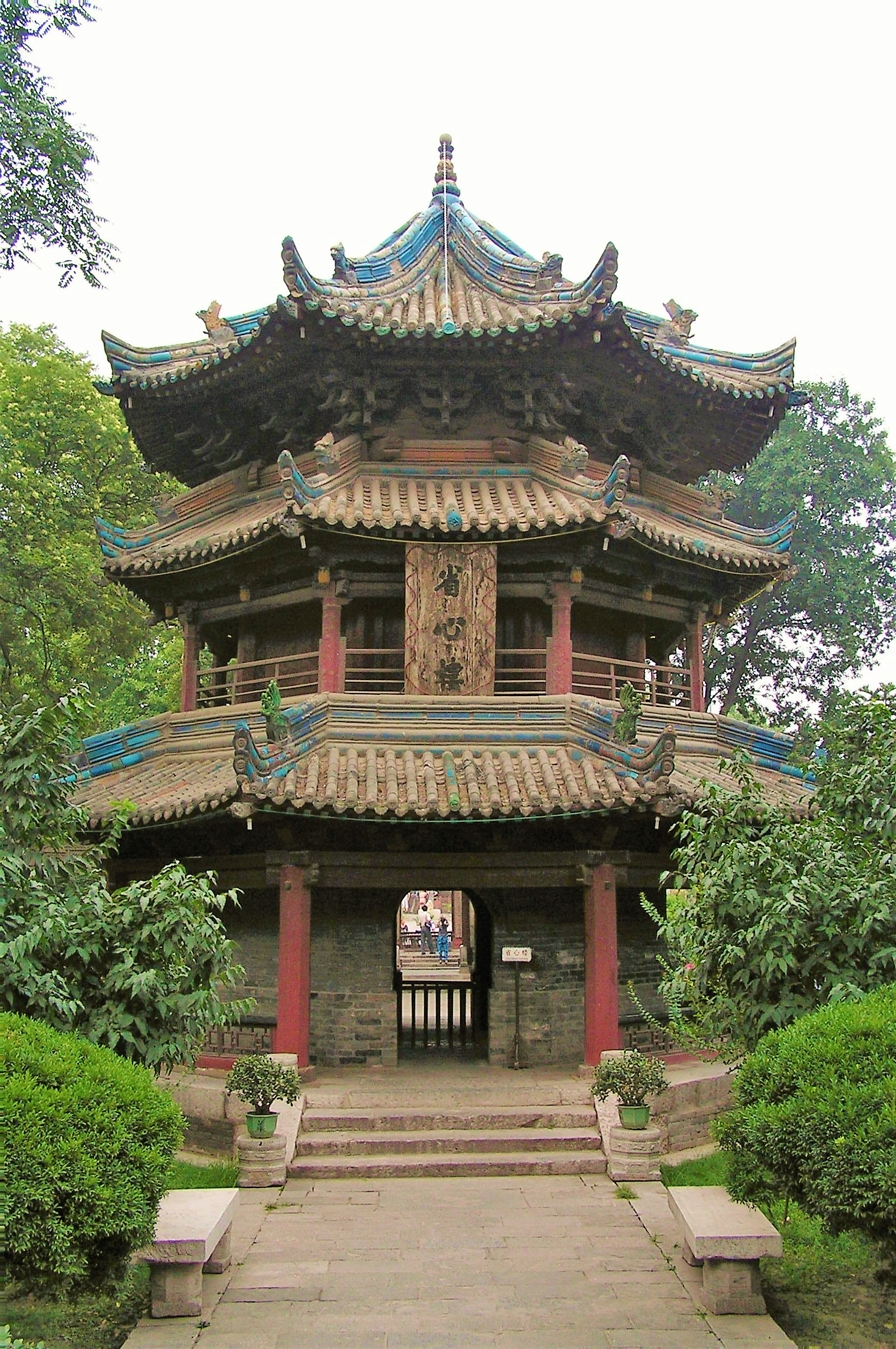
The Great Mosque of Xi'an, one of China's oldest mosques, built during the reign of Emperor Xuanzong.

In and around 716, there was a major locust infestation in the central China region. At Yao's suggestion, Emperor Xuanzong ordered an extensive campaign of extermination, which was said to reduce the impact of the infestation and ward off a major famine. Later in 716, however, due to a corruption scandal involving Yao's sons and his associate Zhao Hui (趙誨), Yao incurred displeasure from Emperor Xuanzong and offered to resign. He and Yuan Qianyao, who replaced Lu after Lu's death earlier in 716, were removed from their offices and replaced with Song Jing and Su Ting, with Song making more of the important decisions and Su assisting. Yao would not return to the chancellorship, but would remain influential as a key advisor for Emperor Xuanzong until Yao's death in 721. Contrary to the practical and flexible Yao, Song was more interested in emphasizing integrity and rule of law in governance, and it was said that while Yao's and Song's emphases were different, they were both regarded as instrumental in establishing the rule of Kaiyuan and that subsequent chancellors could not compare to them.

Meanwhile, Song and Su had carried out a stern campaign against the use of coins that were not officially forged by the government, which brought popular resentment that Emperor Xuanzong found problematic. In 720, he removed Song and Su from chancellor offices and replaced them with Yuan and Zhang Jiazhen, and in 721 added Zhang Yue as a chancellor as well.

Meanwhile, by 722, Empress Wang, who had contributed to Emperor Xuanzong's reign by providing suggestions, had begun to lose favor to Consort Wu, a great-grandniece of Emperor Xuanzong's grandmother Wu Zetian. Emperor Xuanzong secretly discussed with Jiang Jiao the possibility of deposing her, but Jiang Jiao careless leaked the discussion. At the urging of Zhang Jiazhen, who was friendly with Empress Wang's brother Wang Shouyi (王守一), advocated that Jiang Jiao be punished and exiled, and Jiang died in exile.

Meanwhile, at Zhang Yue's suggestion, the Tang northern border defense forces, which had about 600,000 men at that time, was reduced by 200,000 men to allow the soldiers to return home. Further, seeing that the Tang conscription system, due to abuses against the soldiers at the time, was near a collapse, as the soldiers were forced into long tours of duty but their families were not exempt from taxes, thus causing great numbers of desertions, Zhang suggested a switch to a recruitment-based system where soldiers were paid salaries. This allowed, for a time, Tang's soldier supply to be replenished. (Some later historians condemned Zhang for the abolition of the conscription system, believing the abolition to be the root of Tang's later fracturing, but some others, such as the modern historian Bo Yang, argued that Zhang's actions not only were necessary to restore the supply of soldiers but saved many lives.)

==== Middle Kaiyuan era ====
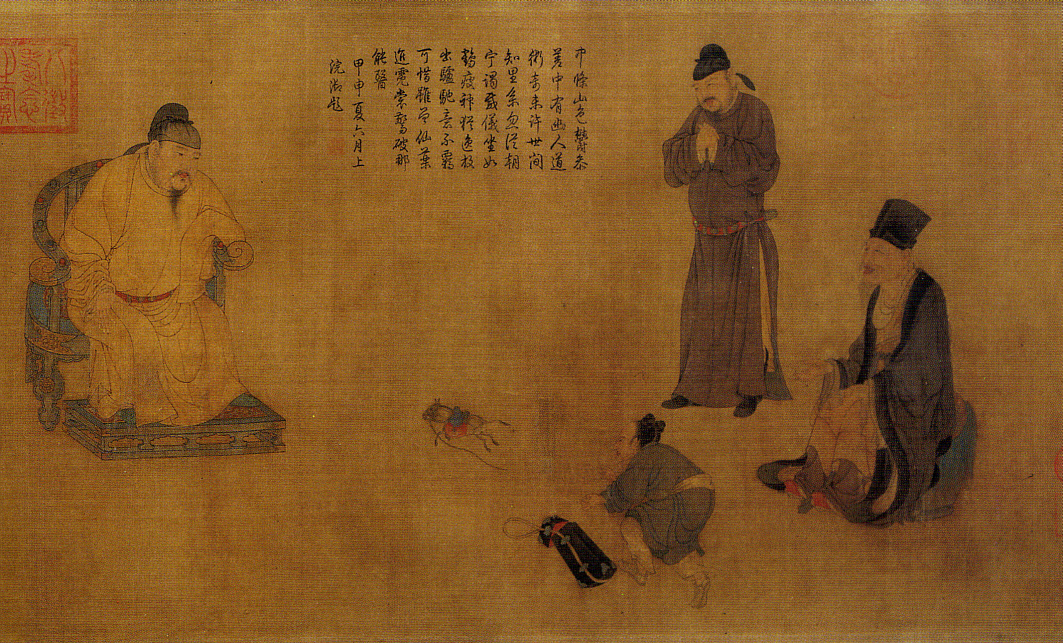
Emperor Xuanzong giving audience to Zhang Guo, by Ren Renfa (1254–1327)

In 723, Zhang Jiazhen was demoted on account of a corruption scandal involving his brother Zhang Jiayou (張嘉祐). His position was filled by Wang Jun, who was soon himself demoted over suspicions, never proven, that he was plotting treason. With Zhang Yue thus effectively being the senior chancellor, Zhang Yue promoted literary studies, which Emperor Xuanzong also favored. In 724, he also commissioned the chief imperial astronomer Nangong Shuo (南宮說) to carry out a major astronomical survey to observe the sun and the North Star at various points of the empire.

Also in 724, it was discovered that Wang Shouyi had engaged sorcerers to make amulets for Empress Wang to wear, hoping that the use of magic would allow her to have a son. Empress Wang was deposed and reduced to commoner rank, while Wang Shouyi was exiled and subsequently ordered to commit suicide in exile. Empress Wang died later in the year, and it was said that the eunuchs and the ladies in waiting mourned her bitterly and Emperor Xuanzong much regretted his treatment of her. Still, after Empress Wang's removal and death, Consort Wu became undisputed mistress of the palace and was treated inside the palace like an empress would be. Still, in 726, when Emperor Xuanzong considered creating her empress, he encountered oppositions from officials on two grounds – that her Wu clan was hated by the people and that as she had her own sons, the position of Li Siqian the Crown Prince (whose name had been changed to Li Hong by this point) would be threatened. As a result, Emperor Xuanzong never created her empress. But Consort Wu's was a chief favorite of the emperor and undisputed mistress of the palace until her death and had political power.

In winter 725, Emperor Xuanzong, at Zhang Yue's urging, carried out a magnificent ceremony at Mount Tai to offer sacrifices to heaven and earth.

On 11 May 726, Zhang Yue was accused of corruption by several officials that he had blocked the advances of – Cui Yinfu (崔隱甫), Yuwen Rong, and Li Linfu – and was found to have committed corruption. At the intercession of Gao Lishi, however, Zhang Yue was removed only from his chancellor post on 18 May and permitted to maintain his title and a number of other posts. He was replaced by Li Yuanhong on 15 May, and subsequently, Du Xian was also added as a chancellor.

In 727, at the suggestion of the general Wang Junchuo (王君㚟), Emperor Xuanzong commissioned Wang Junchuo to attack the Tibetan Empire, and after a Tibetan incursion in late 726, Wang counterattacked and inflicted losses on Tibetan forces commanded by the general Xinuoluogonglu (悉諾邏恭祿). Later in the year, though, Xinuoluogonglu and another general, Zhulongmangbuzhi (燭龍莽布支) attacked and captured Wang's home prefecture Gua Prefecture (瓜州, roughly modern Jiuquan, Gansu), taking Wang's father Wang Shou (王壽) captive. As a result, Wang Junchuo did not dare to counterattack, and subsequently blamed the defeat on a number of tribal chiefs in the area and had them exiles. In response, Yaoluoge Hushu (藥羅葛護輸), the nephew of one of the chiefs so exiled, Yaoluoge Chengzong (藥羅葛承宗), ambushed Wang Junchuo and killed him, and while Yaoluoge Hushu was forced to flee thereafter, for several years Tang did not engage in any offensive campaigns in the region.

Around the same time, Emperor Xuanzong began to build a residential complex in the palace for imperial clan members, known as the Mansion of the Ten Princes (十王院), to centralize their residence. Thereafter, imperial princes, including the crown prince, would rarely live outside the palace complex.

On 6 December 728, Emperor Xuanzong added the general Xiao Song as a chancellor. Subsequently, in 729, with Yuan, even though he was senior chancellor, unable to curb the disputes between Li Yuanhong and Du, Emperor Xuanzong removed all three from chancellor positions, promoting Yuwen and Pei Guangting to be chancellors in their stead – in Yuwen's case, for his abilities to find ways to add to the imperial treasury by imposing special taxes and levies. Later in the year, though, Yuwen made false accusations against the general Li Hui (李褘) the Prince of Xin'an (Emperor Xuanzong's second cousin) and was exiled, and subsequently died in exile. Still, it was said that it was starting from Yuwen's times that Emperor Xuanzong began to pay attention on taxes to replenish the imperial treasury, which traditional historians viewed as the start of his inflicting financial burdens on the people. Further, with Pei in charge of the civil service system, it was said that due to Pei's strict adherence to seniority, the Tang civil service system began to lose its ability to find talented people to serve in offices.

In 730, the Khitan general Ketugan (可突干) killed the king Li Shaogu (李邵固) and took over the reign of the Khitan and the Xi personally, forcing the king of the Xi, Li Lusu (李魯蘇) to flee to Tang for protection. Tang sent an army to attack the Khitan, but meanwhile made peace with the Tibetan Empire. Initially, the campaign against the Khitan did not succeed, but in 732, with Li Hui in command, Tang forces dealt Ketugan a serious defeat and causing many of Ketugan's subordinates to defect and submit to Tang, although Ketugan was not captured.

==== Late Kaiyuan era ====
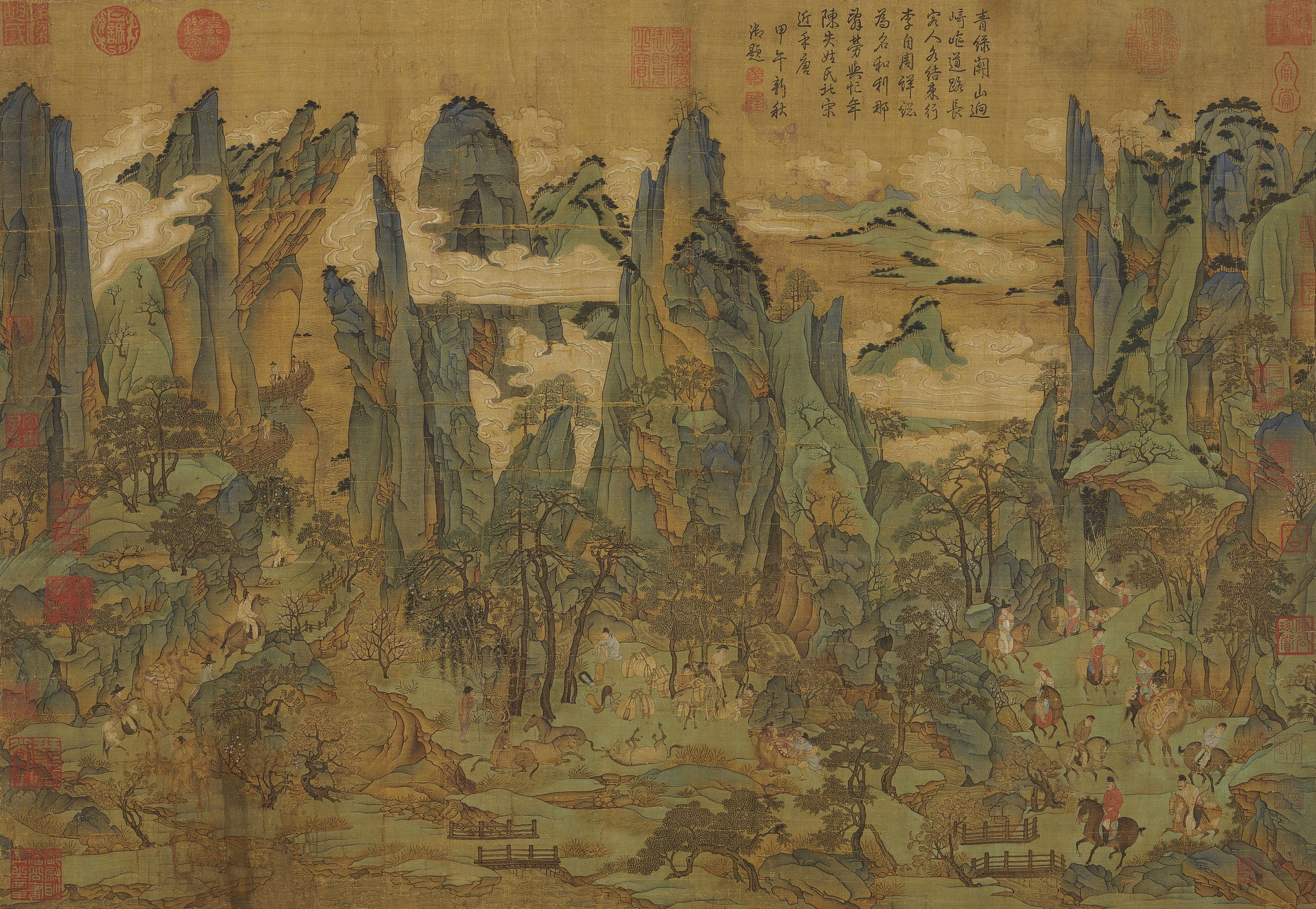
Xuanzong's Journey to Shu, in the manner of the mid 8th century Tang artist Li Zhaodao, an 11th-century Song dynasty remake

Meanwhile, Tang also began to have periodic conflicts with Balhae, and in 733 Emperor Xuanzong tried to commission Dae Mun-ye (大門藝), the brother of Balhae's King Mu, to attack Balhae, along with forces from Silla, but the attack was not successful.

Also in 733, Pei Guangting died, and at the recommendation of Xiao Song, he was replaced with Han Xiu, but soon, Song and Han were in repeated conflicts, and late in 733, both were removed and replaced with Pei Yaoqing, who became known for improving the food distribution system, and Zhang Jiuling, known for his integrity. In 734, Emperor Xuanzong added Li Linfu, a close associate of Consort Wu, as a chancellor as well.

Around the new year 735, Ketuhan was killed in an internal Khitan power struggle, and Khitan became a vassal again, although it would not stay so permanently.

By 736, Emperor Xuanzong was described as having been tired of important affairs of state and beginning to become wasteful and exuberant in his lifestyle. Zhang tried to curb his behavior but thus began to lose favor, while Li Linfu was gaining power due to his association with Consort Wu. Further, Zhang supported Li Hong (whose name had been changed to Li Ying by this point), while Li Linfu and Consort Wu supported her son Li Mao (李瑁) the Prince of Shou and tried to have Li Mao made crown prince. In 736, due to Li Linfu's machinations that made Emperor Xuanzong believed that Zhang and Pei Yaoqing were improperly engaging in factionalism, Zhang and Pei Yaoqing were removed and replaced by Niu Xianke, who closely followed Li Linfu's will, and thereafter, Li Linfu would dominate the imperial government almost to the end of Emperor Xuanzong's reign. Li Linfu did all he could to stay in power, and carried out many dirty tricks against actual or potential threats to his power. He also severely discouraged criticism, ending the relative freedom that officials had to make proposals to Emperor Xuanzong. This was often viewed by traditional historians as the turning point of Emperor Xuanzong's reign, which up to that point was considered a golden age in Chinese history, toward a path of degeneration. The Song dynasty historian Sima Guang, in his Zizhi Tongjian, for example, commented:

Of the chancellors that the Emperor commissioned after he took the throne, Yao Chong emphasized flexibility, Song Jing emphasized the rule of law, Zhang Jiazhen emphasized administrative abilities, Zhang Shuo emphasized literary talent, Li Yuanhong and Du Xian emphasized frugality, and Han Xiu and Zhang Jiuling emphasized honesty. All of them had their different talents. After Zhang Jiuling was demoted, however, the officials were all concerned about keeping their positions, and honest words no longer had a place in government.

In 737, with Zhang no longer in the government to protect him, Li Ying was deposed and subsequently forced to commit suicide. However, with Consort Wu dying later in the year, Emperor Xuanzong did not immediately accept Li Linfu's proposal to have Li Mao made crown prince. Rather, he chose an older son, Li Yu the Prince of Zhong, in 738.

=== Tianbao era (742–756) ===
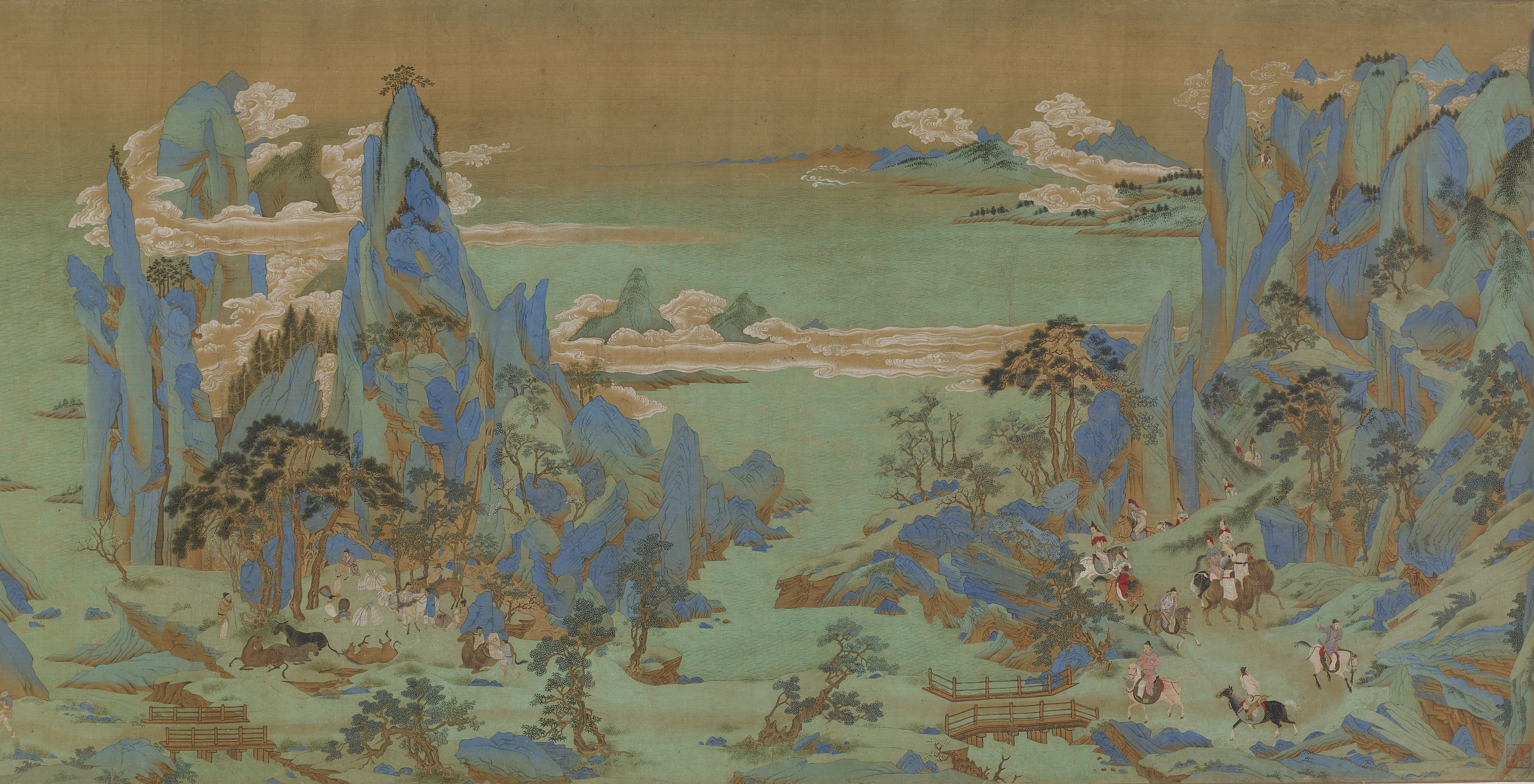
Emperor Xuanzong's Journey to Sichuan, a late Ming dynasty painting after Qiu Ying (1494–1552).

Historians said that Emperor Xuanzong forced tens of thousands of beautiful women to live in his palace to please him, more than many other Tang emperors. And he did not allow many to be set free even when they were old. As Emperor Xuanzong turned his attention to pleasure-seeking with his favorite concubine Yang Guifei and her family, he paid less and less attention to the running of his empire, and much of his power fell into the hands of the corrupt Li Linfu (who was succeeded by Lady Yang's dissolute cousin Yang Guozhong) and the eunuch Gao Lishi.

At the same time, 751 saw the loss of the Battle of Talas against the Abbasid Caliphate. As a consequence, the Tang dynasty temporarily lost some of its influence in Central Asia to the emerging Abbasid Caliphate, as several Tang tributaries turned to the Abbasids.

Meanwhile, the jiedushi (military governors), most of whom were non-Han took more and more regional power into their own hands. Some successful generals included Geshu Han, known for victories over the Tibetan Empire; Gao Xianzhi, who conquered city states of the Xiyu region, eventually battling the Abbasids at Talas; and An Lushan who defeated and once again vassalized the Khitan. Eventually, in 755, An Lushan started the Anshi Rebellion at Fanyang. The rebels quickly seized the eastern capital Luoyang, and then the imperial capital Chang'an six months later. Emperor Xuanzong fled to Sichuan during the war and abdicated the throne to Li Yu (whose name had been changed to Li Heng at that point) (as Emperor Suzong).

==== Early Tianbao era ====
Meanwhile, at Li Linfu's encouragement, Emperor Xuanzong began to promote non-Han generals to command large border armies, believing Li Linfu's assertion that non-Han generals were more likely to be personally loyal to Emperor Xuanzong himself and would not have clan entanglements, even though Li Linfu's own personal motivation was to prevent Han officials from going through the border command route to become chancellors, thus threatening him. Such generals who rose in ranks included An Lushan, An Sishun, Geshu Han, and Gao Xianzhi. By 742, the main Tang forces were all concentrated on the border, at nine different military circuits and one special military district (Lingnan), as well as three special coast defense districts (Changle, Donglai, and Dongmou):

Name of circuit/district	Headquarters location	Responsibility	Garrison strength
Anxi (安西)	Qiuzi (龜茲, in modern Aksu Prefecture, Xinjiang)	pacify the Western Regions (Xiyu)	24,000
Beiting (北庭)	Beiting (in modern Changji Hui Autonomous Prefecture, Xinjiang)	defend against the Tuqishi and Jiankun	20,000
Hexi (河西)	Liang Prefecture (涼州, roughly modern Wuwei, Gansu)	cut off communications between the Tibetan Empire and Eastern Tujue	73,000
Shuofang (朔方)	Ling Prefecture (靈州, roughly modern Yinchuan, Ningxia)	defend against Eastern Tujue	64,700
Hedong (河東)	Taiyuan Municipality	defend against Eastern Tujue	55,000
Fanyang (范陽)	You Prefecture (幽州, roughly modern Beijing)	defend against the Xi and the Khitan	91,400
Pinglu (平盧)	Ying Prefecture (營州, roughly modern Chaoyang, Liaoning)	defend against the Shiwei and the Mohe	37,500
Longyou (隴右)	Shan Prefecture (鄯州, roughly modern Haidong, Qinghai)	defend against the Tibetan Empire	75,000
Jiannan (劍南)	Yi Prefecture (益州, roughly modern Chengdu, Sichuan)	defend against the Tibetan Empire and tribes to the south	30,900
Lingnan (嶺南)	Guang Prefecture (廣州, roughly modern Guangzhou, Guangdong)	pacify the non-Han tribes in the region	15,400
Changle (長樂)	Fu Prefecture (福州, roughly modern Fuzhou, Fujian)	coast watch	1,500
Donglai (東萊)	Lai Prefecture (萊州)	coast watch	1,000
Dongmou (東牟)	Deng Prefecture (登州, in modern Yantai as well)	coast watch	1,000

Meanwhile, it was said that Emperor Xuanzong had paid less attention to increasing revenues after Yuwen Rong's fall, but by 742 he was again interested in doing so, and such officials as Wei Jian (韋堅, a brother-in-law of Li Yu, whose name was changed by this point to Li Heng), Wang Hong (王鉷), and Yang Shenjin (楊慎矜) became favored, and often, matters having to do with finances were stripped out of other officials' responsibilities and given to them as special commissions.

Late in 742, Niu Xianke died and was replaced by Li Shizhi.

In 744, Eastern Tujue, after a series of internal turmoil and rebellions from its vassals, finally collapsed. Its vassal Huige rose and became the dominant power of the region, but formally submitted to Tang as a vassal.

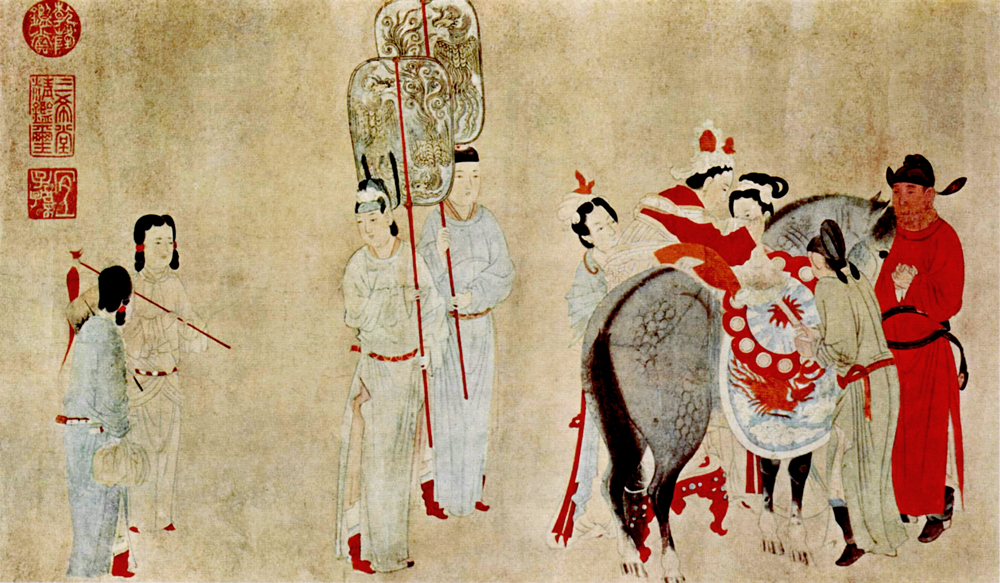
Yang Yuhuan mounting a horse, by Qian Xuan (1235–1305)

Meanwhile, after Consort Wu's death, Emperor Xuanzong had been depressed. When he saw his son Prince of Shou Li Mao's wife (his daughter-in-law) Yang Yuhuan (Princess of Shou, by virtue of marriage), he was infatuated with her, and he had her become a Taoist nun and gave Li Mao the wife of the general Wei Zhaoxun (韋昭訓) as his new wife and princess. Meanwhile, he secretly took the nun, Yang, into the palace. She became his senior-ranking concubine (guifei), known as Yang Guifei, and soon became so powerful that officials were bribing her family members to get preferential treatment. She was referred to inside the palace as "the Lady" and treated like an empress (as was consort Wu until her death). He abducted more than 40000 women in his palace. Some were not set free even after they were over 60 years old.

Meanwhile, Li Linfu was beginning to conflict with Li Shizhi and Wei Jian, who were allies. Li Linfu, who engaged a group of secret police officials to investigate and manufacture evidence against political enemies, was able to get Wei and Li Shizhi demoted and exiled in 746. (Li Shizhi was replaced by Chen Xilie, who gained favor from Emperor Xuanzong for his knowledge in Taoism and sorcery.) In 747, Li Linfu further carried out a campaign of terror against exiled officials, and among the officials executed were Wei, Li Yong (李邕) and Pei Dunfu (裴敦復). Li Shizhi and Wang Ju, who had been instrumental in Emperor Xuanzong's initial actions against Princess Taiping, committed suicide.

Meanwhile, in 747, Emperor Xuanzong wanted to expand the government's talent pool, and so issued an edict ordering that the people who had unusual talents to come to Chang'an to be examined by himself. Li Linfu, fearing that these examinees might accuse him of improprieties when they get to meet the emperor, suggested that these examinees go through two levels of preliminary examinations – by the local governments, and then by the executive bureau. As a result, no one passed the first two levels of preliminary examinations, and Li Linfu subsequently submitted a note to Emperor Xuanzong congratulating him that no talent has been overlooked by the imperial administration.

Tang territories and Tang provinces by 742.

Meanwhile, also as of 747, An Lushan had become greatly favored by Emperor Xuanzong due to his military achievements and his willingness to flatter Emperor Xuanzong, Consort Yang, and her family members. Further, Li Linfu, apprehensive about the general Wang Zhongsi, who at that time was in command of four circuits (Hexi, Longyou, Shuofang, and Hedong), deprecated Wang in favor of An Lushan. In 747, after Li Linfu implicated Wang in hindering a campaign against the Tibetan Empire and further accused Wang of plotting a coup to overthrow Emperor Xuanzong and replace him with Li Heng, Wang was arrested and demoted, escaping death only at the pleas of Geshu, who was Wang's deputy and who subsequently was given the commands of Hexi and Longyou. An Lushan, who had already been in command of Fanyang and Pinglu Circuits, was also given Hedong, and thereafter was in command of the most elite troops of the empire. Meanwhile, the ethnically Goguryeo general Gao Xianzhi had become prominent in the Xiyu region, expanding Tang power to the west.

By 748, Consort Yang's cousins Yang Guozhong, Yang Xian (楊銛) and Yang Qi (楊錡), as well as her three sisters (who were created the Ladies of Han, Guo, and Qin), had become exceedingly wealthy and powerful due to the favors that Emperor Xuanzong showed them. It was said that their wealth topped all households in Chang'an. It was also said that by 749, the empire was so wealthy that Emperor Xuanzong viewed treasures as expendable and so awarded them without limit.

==== Late Tianbao era ====
Meanwhile, Li Linfu had a tight grip on power and favors from Emperor Xuanzong throughout the years, but as of 750, Yang Guozhong and Chen Xilie had allied with each other and were finding ways to eliminate Li Linfu's allies from government.

As of 751, Tang was also facing defeats on two different external fronts – Yunnan and Central Asia. As Nanzhao king Geluofeng (閤羅鳳) was angry about unreasonable demands that the Zhang Qiantuo (張虔陀) the governor of Yunnan Commandery (雲南, roughly modern Chuxiong Yi Autonomous Prefecture, Yunnan) and Zhang's subsequent false accusations that he was planning to rebel, he launched the Tianbao War, capturing Yunnan Commandery. A major attack by the general Xianyu Zhongtong (鮮于仲通) against Nanzhao failed terribly in 751, and subsequent defeats by Tang forces eventually led to a total of some 200,000 casualties among Tang troops. On the western front, Gao Xianzhi suffered a major defeat at the Abbasid forces at the Battle of Talas in 751 as well, ending the Tang expansion to the west.

In 752, Wang Hong's brother Wang Han (王銲) was accused of treason after his associates rose in a failed coup at Chang'an. In the aftermaths, Wang Hong was forced to commit suicide, and Yang Guozhong, Chen, and Geshu Han further tried to implicate Li Linfu in the plot as well. After Li Linfu died in winter 752, Yang Guozhong succeeded him, and almost immediately accused Li Linfu of having been complicit in the rebellion of another general, Li Xianzhong (李獻忠). Li Linfu was posthumously disgraced, and his family was exiled.

A rivalry soon developed between Yang Guozhong and An Lushan, and Yang Guozhong began to repeatedly warn Emperor Xuanzong that An was plotting rebellion. Emperor Xuanzong ignored the warnings. In 754, Yang Guozhong suggested that if An were summoned to the capital, he would surely refuse, and Emperor Xuanzong decided to try An – and An arrived in Chang'an immediately after being summoned. After this incident, Emperor Xuanzong no longer believed that An was plotting rebellion. Nevertheless, because of Yang Guozhong's opposition, he did not make An chancellor, as he was planning. Also in 754, with Yang Guozhong also trying to squeeze Chen out of the government, Chen resigned and was replaced by Wei Jiansu.

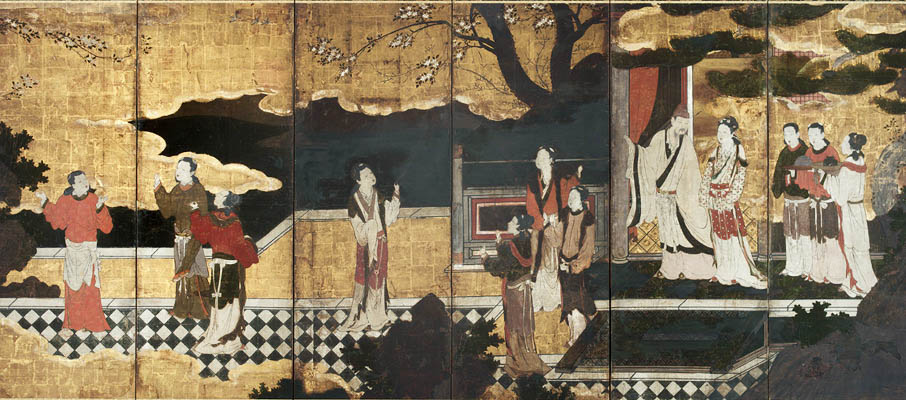
Xuanzong with Consort Yang on a terrace with their attendants, by Japanese artist Kanō Eitoku (1543–1590)

In 755, Yang Guozhong further provoked An, who was then back at his post in Fanyang, by surrounding An's mansion at Chang'an and arresting and executing An's staff members. An, in fear and anger, rebelled in winter 755, and quickly reached and captured Luoyang after defeating Feng Changqing's undersupplied army. Subsequently, Emperor Xuanzong, believing in reports from the eunuch Bian Lingcheng (邊令誠) that Feng was cowardly and that Feng's superior Gao Xianzhi was corrupt, executed both Feng and Gao and replaced Gao with Geshu in defending Tong Pass from An's advances. An declared himself emperor of a new state of Yan at Luoyang, but with Geshu defending Tong Pass, An's advances stalled, while Tang forces commanded by Li Guangbi and Guo Ziyi made advances against An-controlled territory north of the Yellow River. Meanwhile, though, Yang Guozhong, fearing that Geshu had designs against him, convinced Emperor Xuanzong to order Geshu to attack despite Geshu's warnings that doing so was risky. Geshu was subsequently defeated by An's forward commander Cui Qianyou (崔乾祐), and Tong Pass fell. With An's forces advancing on Chang'an, on 14 July 756, Emperor Xuanzong, with Yang Guozhong suggesting that they flee to Jiannan Circuit, abandoned Chang'an and fled with Gao Lishi, Yang Guozhong, Wei, Li Heng, Consort Yang, and her family. The following day, 15 July, the imperial guards accompanying the emperor, angry at Yang Guozhong, rose and killed him and forced Emperor Xuanzong to kill Consort Yang as well. Subsequently, Emperor Xuanzong continued on to Jiannan, but Li Heng did not, but rather went to Lingwu, where, on 12 August, Li Heng was declared emperor (as Emperor Suzong). Meanwhile, without knowledge that Emperor Suzong had claimed the throne, Emperor Xuanzong, while still on his way to Chengdu, the capital of Jiannan Circuit, issued an edict that gave several of his sons various responsibility areas, under Li Heng's command overall; until this edict was issued, most of the realm only knew that Chang'an had fallen and had not known where Emperor Xuanzong had fled. When the news of Emperor Suzong's ascension reached Emperor Xuanzong at Chengdu on 10 September, he recognized Emperor Suzong as the new emperor, and thereafter took the title of Taishang Huang (retired emperor) – although his edict recognizing Emperor Suzong appeared to still indicate desire to retain control like his father Emperor Ruizong did early in his reign:

From now on, my edicts (敕, chi) shall be referred to as gao (誥), and submissions to me shall address me as Taishang Huang. All matters relating to the military or the state throughout the realm shall first be submitted to the Emperor before being submitted to me. After the capital is recaptured, I will no longer oversee the affairs of state.

However, perhaps to avoid the impression that he was keeping a rival government to Emperor Suzong, he sent the several chancellors that he had retained or created while on the journey to or after he arrived in Chengdu – Wei, Fang Guan, and Cui Huan – to Lingwu to formally invest imperial power on Emperor Suzong and to serve under Emperor Suzong.

== As retired emperor ==
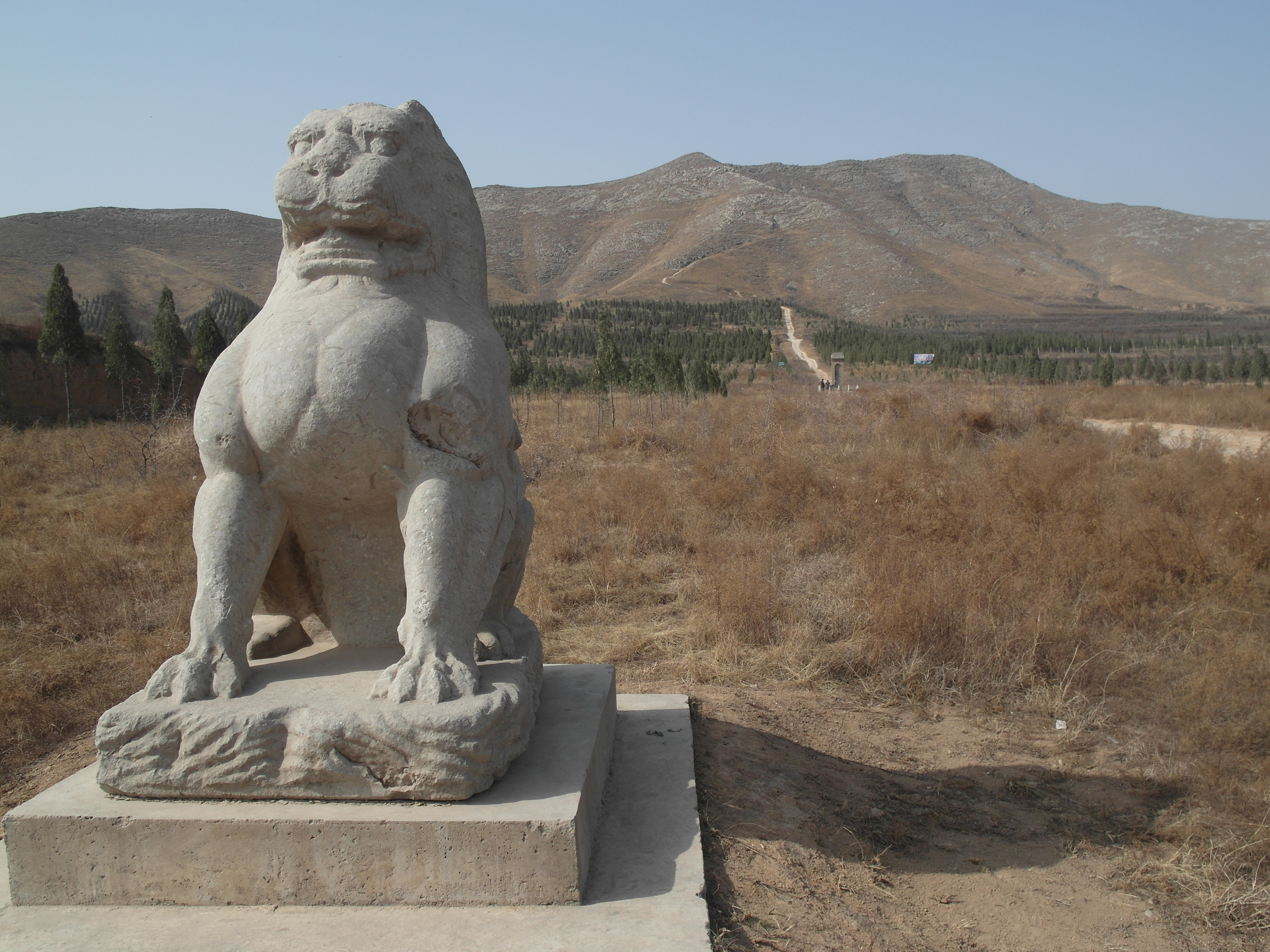
Tailing (泰陵), the tomb of Emperor Xuanzong, in Pucheng County, Shaanxi

Emperor Xuanzong, after becoming retired emperor, largely allowed Emperor Suzong to coordinate the campaign against Yan, but at times nevertheless stepped in to make decisions. For example, in spring 757, apparently without first consulting Emperor Suzong, he named Li Lin chancellor, although he subsequently sent both Li Lin and another chancellor, Cui Yuan, whom he had not sent to Emperor Suzong previously, to Emperor Suzong. He also posthumously honored Emperor Suzong's mother Consort Yang (not Yang Yuhuan) as an empress. Meanwhile, remembering Zhang Jiuling had previously warned about An Lushan, Emperor Xuanzong sent messengers to Zhang's tomb to offer sacrifices to him.

Late in 757, Emperor Suzong, with aid from Huige, recaptured Chang'an from Yan, then ruled by An Lushan's son An Qingxu, who had killed An Lushan earlier in 757 and taken over the throne himself. After Emperor Suzong recaptured Chang'an, he sent messengers to Emperor Xuanzong requesting that he return to Chang'an and offering the throne back to Emperor Xuanzong. Emperor Xuanzong, apprehensive of the offer, initially not only declined but further requested to remain in Jiannan. Only after Emperor Suzong, at the suggestion of his strategist Li Mi, had the government officials make a joint submission to Emperor Xuanzong no longer mentioning the return of the throne, did Emperor Xuanzong agree to depart Jiannan to return to Chang'an. On the way back to Chang'an, he had Gao Lishi try to dig up Consort Yang Yuhuan's body for reburial, but her body had already decomposed; only her fragrance bag remained. Emperor Xuanzong took the fragrance bag back to Chang'an and visited it daily, as if Consort Yang were still alive. On 17 January 758, he arrived at Chang'an, and in a grand ceremony where Emperor Suzong offered the throne back to him again, he formally declined again and personally put the yellow robe symbolizing imperial status on Emperor Suzong, commenting, "I had been the Son of Heaven for 50 years, and I did not consider it a great honor. Now, I am truly honored to be the father to the Son of Heaven." He took up residence at Xingqing Palace, a palace that was remodelled from the residence that he and his brothers had when they were imperial princes.

After Emperor Xuanzong was back in Chang'an, he largely stayed out of policy decisions, although he at times still exerted his influence on Emperor Suzong. For example, Emperor Suzong had wanted to spare Zhang Shuo's sons Zhang Jun (張均) and Zhang Ji (張垍), who had previously submitted to An Lushan, because of Zhang Shuo's contributions and Zhang Jun's and Zhang Ji's prior efforts to protect him from Li Linfu's machinations, but Emperor Xuanzong deeply hated them for having surrendered to An, and at Emperor Xuanzong's insistence, Zhang Jun was executed, and Zhang Ji was exiled to Lingnan.

Meanwhile, after a while, Emperor Xuanzong settled into a routine at Xingqing Palace, with Chen Xuanli and Gao Lishi attending to him. Also often attending to him were his daughter Li Chiying (李持盈), the Princess Yuzhen, the lady in waiting Ru Xianyuan (如仙媛), and the eunuchs Wang Cheng'en (王承恩) and Wei Yue (魏悅). The imperial musicians often played for him, and he often climbed up Changqing Tower (長慶樓) to receive well wishes from the populace. He also often held feasts for generals and people from Jiannan, with Li Chiying and Ru serving as hostesses. Meanwhile, though, Emperor Xuanzong's attendants looked down at the powerful eunuch Li Fuguo, who had served Emperor Suzong throughout the campaign against Yan. To retaliate, Li Fuguo began to try to convince Emperor Suzong that Emperor Xuanzong and his attendants were plotting to seize power back. In 760, with Emperor Suzong's tacit, although not explicit, approval, on one occasion when Emperor Xuanzong was out riding, Li Fuguo intercepted him and forced him to move back to the main palace. Even on that occasion, however, Gao would not submit to Li Fuguo, and even yelled at Li Fuguo to force him to get off his horse and to escort Emperor Xuanzong on foot, along with Gao. Soon after Emperor Xuanzong was forcibly moved, Li Fuguo forced Chen to retire, Li Chiying to return to her temple (she had become an ordained Taoist nun in 711), and exiled Gao, Wang, Wei, and Ru.

After Emperor Xuanzong was forcibly moved back to the main palace, Emperor Suzong tried to please him by offering him the best of all of the tributes of the land first, but Emperor Xuanzong became depressed and rarely ate meat, and quickly became ill. Emperor Suzong had his daughters Princesses Wan'an and Xianyi attend to their grandfather, and initially frequently personally visited Emperor Xuanzong, but after some time became ill himself and could not visit Emperor Xuanzong. He began to regret forcibly moving Emperor Xuanzong and considered killing Li Fuguo, but as Li Fuguo wielded command of the imperial guards at this time, he did not dare to try to do so. Emperor Xuanzong died, in that depressed state, on 3 May 762.

Emperor Xuanzong was deeply criticized by later historians for his wastefulness and for his appointing of Li Linfu, Yang Guozhong, and An to prominent offices. The strength that Xuanzong had allowed the military governors to have, which was perpetuated after Tang had defeated Yan, led to a period of increasing conflict and instability which set the stage for the decline of the Tang dynasty and the ensuing Five Dynasties and Ten Kingdoms period.

== Poetry ==
Xuanzong had one poem collected in the famous poetry anthology Three Hundred Tang Poems, in the style of the five-character-regular-verse (wulu) form and in the huaigu genre, and which was translated by Witter Bynner as "I Pass Through the Lu Dukedom with a Sigh and a Sacrifice for Confucius". This poem refers to the philosopher-sage Confucius and to Confucius' home state of Lu, during the by-then long-gone Spring and Autumn period, and expresses sadness for what is past and beyond recall, thus reflecting on the transience of mortal existence.

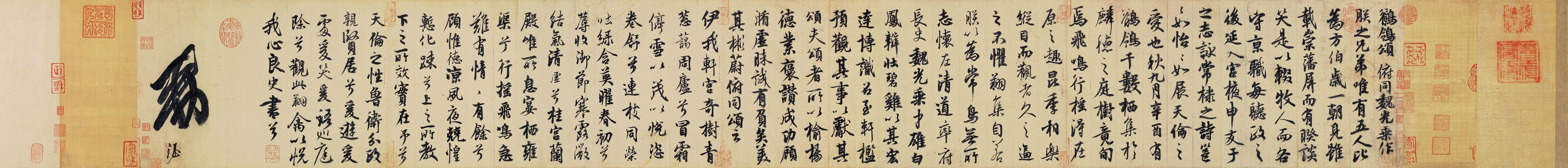
The Ode on Pied Wagtails, the only known surviving example of Xuanzong's calligraphy

== Chancellors during reign ==
- Cen Xi (712–713)
- Liu Youqiu (712, 713)
- Cui Shi (712–713)
- Lu Xiangxian (712–713)
- Wei Zhigu (712–713)
- Dou Huaizhen (712–713)
- Xiao Zhizhong (713)
- Guo Yuanzhen (713)
- Zhang Yue (713, 721–726)
- Yao Chong (713–716)
- Lu Huaishen (713–716)
- Xue Na (713)
- Yuan Qianyao (716, 720–729)
- Song Jing (716–720)
- Su Ting (716–720)
- Zhang Jiazhen (720–723)
- Wang Jun (723)
- Li Yuanhong (726–729)
- Du Xian (726–729)
- Xiao Song (728–733)
- Pei Guangting (729–733)
- Yuwen Rong (729)
- Han Xiu (733)
- Pei Yaoqing (733–736)
- Zhang Jiuling (733–736)
- Li Linfu (734–752)
- Niu Xianke (736–742)
- Li Shizhi (742–746)
- Chen Xilie (746–754)
- Yang Guozhong (752–756)
- Wei Jiansu (754–756)
- Cui Yuan (756)
- Fang Guan (756)

== Family ==
The names of Xuanzong's daughters (and indeed the daughters of the Tang emperors) and some brief facts about them were recorded in vol.83 of New Book of Tang.

- Empress, of the Wang clan of Taiyuan (皇后 太原王氏; d. 724)
- Empress Zhenshun, of the Wu clan (貞順皇后 武氏／贞顺皇后 武氏; 699–737), third cousin
  - Li Yi, Prince Dao of Xia (夏悼王 李一; 716–717), ninth son
  - Princess Shangxian (上仙公主)
  - Li Min, Prince Ai of Huai (懷哀王 李敏／怀哀王 李敏; 719–720), 15th son
  - Li Mao, Prince Shou (壽王 李瑁／寿王 李瑁; 720–775), 18th son
  - Li Qi, Prince Sheng (盛王 李琦; d. 764), 21st son
  - Princess Xianyi (咸宜公主;722–784)
    - Married Yang Hui of Hongnong (弘農 楊洄／弘农 杨洄; d. 761) in 735, and had issue (one son)
    - Married Cui Song of Boling (博陵 崔嵩) in 761
  - Princess Taihua (太華公主／太华公主), 21st daughter
    - Married Yang Qi of Hongnong (弘農 楊錡／弘农 杨锜) in 745
- Empress Yuanxian, of the Yang clan of Hongnong (元獻皇后 弘農楊氏/元献皇后 弘农杨氏; 699–729)
  - Li Heng, Emperor Suzong (肅宗 李亨／肃宗 李亨; 711–762), 3rd son
  - Princess Qi (齊公主／齐国公主), 8th daughter
    - Married Zhang Ji (張垍／张垍), the second son of Zhang Yue, in 728, and had issue (one daughter)
    - Married Pei Ying of Hedong (河東 裴潁／河东 裴颍) in 730
    - Married Yang Dun of Hongnong (弘農 楊敦／弘农 杨敦)
- Noble Consort Yang, of the Yang clan of Hongnong (貴妃 弘農楊氏／贵妃 弘农杨氏; 719–756), personal name Yuhan (玉環)
- Noble Consort, of the Dong clan (貴妃 董氏／贵妃 董氏)
- Noble Consort, of the Xiang clan (貴妃 項氏／贵妃 项氏)
  - Unnamed daughter
- Noble Consort Yang, of the Yang clan of Hongnong (淑妃 弘農楊氏／淑妃 弘农杨氏), personal Zhenyi (真一)
- Pure Consort, of the Huangfu clan of Anding (淑妃 安定皇甫氏; 694–735)
  - Li Yao, Prince E (鄂王 李瑤; d. 737), 5th son
  - Princess Linjin (臨晉公主／临晋公主; d. 773), 2nd daughter
    - Married Zheng Qianyao of Xingyang (滎陽 鄭潛曜／荥阳 郑潜曜) in 740
- Virtuous Consort, of the Qian clan (德妃 錢氏／钱氏)
  - Li Yan, Prince Di (棣王 李琰; d. 752), 4th son
- Elegant Consort, of the Zhao clan (麗妃 趙氏／丽妃 赵氏; 693–726)
  - Li Ying, Crown Prince (皇太子 李瑛; d. 737), 2nd son
- Splendid Consort, of the Liu clan (華妃 劉氏／华妃 刘氏)
  - Li Cong, Emperor Fengtian (奉天皇帝 李琮; d. 752), 1st son
  - Li Wan, Crown Prince Jinggong (靖恭皇太子 李琬; d. 755), 6th son
  - Li Sui, Prince Yi (儀王 李璲／仪王 李璲; d. 765), 12th son
- Imperial Concubine of the First Rank, of the Lin clan (昭儀／昭仪 林氏)
  - Princess Yichun (宜春公主)
- Imperial Concubine of the Fourth Rank, of the Guo clan (順儀／顺仪 郭氏)
  - Li Lin, Prince Yong (永王 李璘; d. 757), 16th son
- Imperial Concubine of the Third Rank, of the Wu clan (賢儀／贤仪 武氏), third cousin
  - Li Xuan, Prince Liang (涼王 李璿; d. 774), 29th son
  - Li Jing, Prince Ai of Bian (汴哀王 李璥; d. 736), 30th son
- Imperial Concubine of the Sixth Rank, of the Dong clan (芳儀/芳仪 董氏), personal name Fangyi (芳仪)
  - Princess Guangning (廣寧公主／广宁公主)
    - Married Cheng Changyin (程昌胤; 725–784)
    - Married Su Kezhen (蘇克貞／苏克贞)
- Fairness Lady, of the Liu clan of Hedong (婕妤 河東柳氏／婕妤 河东柳氏)
  - Princess Qi (齊公主), 1st daughter
    - Married Wang Yao of Langya, Duke Langya (琊瑯 王繇／瑯琊公 王徭) in 723, and had issue (one son)
  - Li Bin, Prince Yan (延王 李玢; d. 784), 20th son
- Fairness Lady of the Gao clan (婕妤 高氏; 694–739)
  - Li Jiao, Prince Ying (潁王 李璬／颍王 李璬; 718–783), 13th son
  - Princess Changle (昌樂公主／昌乐公主)
    - Married Dou E of Henan (河南 竇鍔／河南 窦锷) in 737
- Beauty, of the Zhong clan (美人 鍾氏／钟氏)
  - Li Huan, Prince Ji (濟王 李環／济王 李环; d. 768), 22nd son
- Beauty, of the Lu clan (美人 盧氏／卢氏)
  - Li Huang, Prince Xin (信王 李瑝; 725–774), 23rd son
- Beauty, of the Wang clan (美人 王氏)
  - Li Gui, Prince Chen (陳王 李珪／陈王 李珪; 725–784), 25th son
- Beauty, of the Du clan (美人 杜氏)
  - Princess Wanchun (萬春公主／万春公主; 732–770), 24th daughter
    - Married Yang Fei of Hongnong (弘農 楊朏／弘农 杨朏; d. 756), a son of Yang Guozhong, in 754
    - Married Yang Qi of Hongnong (弘農 楊錡／弘农 杨锜) in 756
- Talented Lady, of the Liu clan (才人 劉氏／刘 氏)
  - Li Ju, Prince Guang (光王 李琚; d. 737), 8th son
- Talented Lady, of the Yan clan (才人 閻氏／阎氏)
  - Princess Xincheng (信成公主)
    - Married Dugu Ming of Henan (河南 獨孤明／独孤明) in 737, and had issue (one daughter)
  - Li Ci, Prince Yi (義王 李玼／义王 李玼; 725–784), 24th son
- Talented Lady, of the Chen clan (才人 陳氏／陈氏)
  - Li Gong, Prince Feng (豐王 李珙／丰王 李珙; d. 763), 26th son
- Talented Lady, of the Zheng clan (才人 鄭氏／郑氏)
  - Li Tian, Prince Heng (恆王 李瑱／恒王 李瑱), 27th son
- Talented Lady, of the Zhao clan (才人 趙氏／赵氏)
  - Princess Shouguang (壽光公主／寿光公主; 726–750), 22nd daughter
    - Married Guo Ye of Jingzhao (京兆 郭液) in 746, and had issue (one son)
- Talented Lady, of the Chang clan (才人 常氏)
  - Princess Xinping (新平公主; d. 775)
    - Married Pei Jian of Hedong (河東 裴玪／河东 裴玪), and had issue (one son)
    - Married Jiang Qingchu of Tianshui, Duke Chu (天水 姜慶初／姜庆初; d. 767) in 751
- Lady, of the Caoyena clan (曹野那氏)
  - Princess Shou'an (壽安公主／寿安公主), personal name Chongniang (蟲娘／虫娘)
    - Married Su Fa (蘇發／苏发)
- Unknown
  - Li Xun, Prince An (安王 李洵)
  - Princess Changfen (常芬公主), 2nd daughter
    - Married Zhang Qushe, Count Fanyang (張去奢／张去奢; 688–747) in 731
  - Princess Xiaochang (孝昌公主), 3rd daughter
  - Princess Tangchang (唐昌公主), 4th daughter
    - Married Xue Xiu of Hedong (河東 薛銹／河东 薛锈; d. 737) in 728 and issue (one son)
  - Princess Lingchang (靈昌公主／灵昌公主), 5th daughter
  - Princess Changshan (常山公主), 6th daughter
    - Married Xue Tan of Hedong (河東 薛譚／河东 薛谭; d. 728) in 728
    - Married Dou Ze of Henan (河南 竇澤／窦泽) in 728
  - Princess Wan'an (萬安公主／万安公主)
  - Princess Huaisi (懷思公主／怀思公主)
  - Princess Jin (晉公主／晋公主), 11th daughter
    - Married Cui Huitong of Qinghe (清河 崔惠童) in 737
  - Princess Xinchang (新昌公主)
    - Married Xiao Heng of Lanling (蘭陵 蕭衡／兰陵 箫衡; d. 747), a son of Xiao Song, and had issue (five sons, one daughter)
  - Princess Wei (衛公主／卫公主)
    - Married Doulu Jian of Changli, Duke Rui (昌黎 豆盧建／昌黎 豆卢建; 706–744) in 737
    - Married Yang Shuo of Hongnong (弘農 楊說／弘农 杨说) in 744
  - Princess Zhenyang (真陽公主／真阳公主)
    - Married Yuan Qing of Henan (河南 源清) in 740
    - Married Su Zhen, Duke Qi (蘇震／苏震)
  - Princess Chu (楚公主)
    - Married Wu Chengjiang, Duke Puyang (吳澄江), and had issue (one son)
  - Princess Yongning (永寧公主／永宁公主), 17th daughter
    - Married Pei Qiqiu of Hedong (河東 裴齊丘／河东 裴齐丘) in 738
  - Princess Song (宋公主), 19th daughter
    - Married Wen Xihua (溫西華／温西华) in 747
    - Married Yang Hui (楊徽／杨徽)
  - Princess Lecheng (樂城公主／乐城公主), 23rd daughter
    - Married Xue Lüqian of Hedong (河東 薛履謙／河东 薛履谦; d. 761) in 746

== Religious views ==
Xuanzong "ordered his four brothers to worship in the Chang'an Nestorian church", but also asked that paintings of him and the four previous emperors be kept in the church there.

== In literature ==
- 'The Smile that cost an Empire' (1950, revised 1953), a long "dialogue" poem by F. L. Lucas, set in 755, in which Emperor Xuanzong of Tang discusses Yang Guifei with elderly court poet Yuan Shen, followed by a narrative coda set in 756.

== See also ==
1. Chinese emperors family tree (middle)

== Notes ==
Emperor Xuanzong of Tang House of Li Born: 8 September 685
Regnal titles
Preceded by Emperor Ruizong of Tang	Emperor of the Tang dynasty 712–756	Succeeded by Emperor Suzong of Tang
Preceded by Emperor Ruizong of Tang	Emperor of China (most regions); 712–756	Succeeded by Emperor Suzong of Tang
Preceded by Emperor Ruizong of Tang	Emperor of China (Central/Northern); 712–756	Succeeded by An Lushan of Yan
