= Dou Huaizhen =

Chinese official

Dou Huaizhen (Chinese: 竇懷貞; died July 29, 713), known by his courtesy name Dou Congyi (竇從一) during the second reign of Emperor Zhongzong (r. 705–710), posthumously renamed Du Huaizhen (毒懷貞), was an official of the Chinese Tang dynasty and Wu Zetian's Zhou dynasty, serving as a chancellor during the reigns of Emperor Ruizong and Emperor Xuanzong.

== Background ==
It is not known when Dou Huaizhen was born, but it is known that he was a son of Dou Dexuan, who served as a chancellor during the reign of Emperor Gaozong. It was said that he had a treacherous mind in his youth, but was also known for being frugal and not competing in luxury spending with others. He later served as the magistrate of Qinghe County and was said to have governed it well. He was later promoted to be the commandant at Yue Prefecture (越州, roughly modern Shaoxing, Zhejiang) and then the secretary general at Yang Prefecture (揚州, roughly modern Yangzhou, Jiangsu).

== During Emperor Zhongzong's second reign ==
Probably in 705, at the start of the second reign of Emperor Gaozong's son Emperor Zhongzong, Dou Huaizhen, in order to observe naming taboo for Wei Xuanzhen (韋玄貞), the father of Emperor Zhongzong's powerful wife Empress Wei, started using his courtesy name of Congyi rather than Huaizhen as his name. As of 706, he was serving as the prefect of Pu Prefecture (蒲州, roughly modern Yuncheng, Shanxi), when he was made the secretary general of the capital prefecture Yong Prefecture (雍州, roughly modern Xi'an, Shaanxi). It was said that at this time, he was seeking to ingratiate himself with powerful individuals. On one occasion, when Emperor Zhongzong's sister Princess Taiping was litigating with a Buddhist temple as to the ownership of a mill, Dou's subordinate, the census officer Li Yuanhong, ruled for the temple. Dou was shocked and tried to get Li to change his ruling; Li responded by writing, in large characters, under his ruling, "The Southern Mountains [(i.e., the Qinling Mountains)] may move before this ruling may be changed." Dou could not do anything about it. It was further said that he was apprehensive of the power that court eunuchs held, and whenever litigants did not have beards, he would believe that they were eunuchs and try to ingratiate them. Later, when he served as chief imperial censor reviewing central government affairs (左御史大夫, Zuo Yushi Daifu), one of his subordinate censors, Wei Chuangong (魏傳弓), wished to indict the eunuch Xue Sijian (薛思簡), seeking to have Xue executed, Dou, because Xue was well-trusted by Emperor Zhongzong's powerful daughter Li Guo'er the Princess Anle, stopped Wei from doing so.

On Chinese New Year's eve in 709 (February 13, 709) Emperor Zhongzong held a festival of observing New Year's Eve inside the palace. During the feast, Emperor Zhongzong offered to find Dou, whose wife had died some time ago, a wife. Dou agreed—and Emperor Zhongzong had Empress Wei's wet nurse Lady Wang brought out. Dou married Lady Wang, and Emperor Zhongzong created her the Lady of Ju. As the husband of a wet nurse was often referred to as Azhe at the time, thereafter, whenever Dou submitted reports to Emperor Zhongzong, he referred to himself as, "the Azhe of Empress Yisheng [(the honorific title for Empress Wei)]." He also ingratiated himself with the chancellor Zong Chuke and Princess Anle, and thereafter had a poor public reputation.

== During Emperor Shang's reign and Emperor Ruizong's second reign ==
In 710, Emperor Zhongzong died suddenly—a death that traditional historians believed to be a poisoning by Empress Wei and Li Guo'er, so that Empress Wei could become empress regnant like Emperor Zhongzong's mother Wu Zetian and Li Guo'er could be crown princess. Meanwhile, Emperor Zhongzong's son by a concubine, Li Chongmao the Prince of Wen, was named emperor (as Emperor Shang), but Empress Wei retained power as empress dowager and regent. Less than a month later, Princess Taiping and Emperor Zhongzong's nephew Li Longji the Prince of Linzi rose in rebellion, killing Empress Dowager Wei and Li Guo'er. When Dou Congyi heard this, he beheaded his wife Lady Wang and offered her head to Li Longji, trying to save himself. He was not killed, but was demoted to be the prefect of Hao Prefecture (濠州, roughly modern Fengyang, Anhui). He changed his name back to Huaizhen around this time. Sometime thereafter, after Li Longji's father Li Dan the Prince of Xiang, a former emperor, was restored to the throne (as Emperor Ruizong), Dou was made the secretary general at Yi Prefecture (益州, roughly modern Chengdu, Sichuan).

In 711, Dou was recalled to the capital to serve as the director of imperial palace affairs (殿中監, Dianzhong Jian), and in a month was returned to the post of chief imperial censor. He was also given the designation Tong Zhongshu Menxia Pingzhangshi (同中書門下平章事), making him a chancellor de facto. Later in the year, he was made Shizhong (侍中), the head of the examination bureau of government (門下省, Menxia Sheng), a post considered one for a chancellor. It was said that he was deeply involved in the faction of Princess Taiping, and he often went to her mansion directly after imperial meetings and did what she ordered him to do. Further, at that time, Emperor Ruizong was carrying out an expensive project of building Taoist temples for his daughters Princesses Jinxian and Yuzhen, who had become Taoist nuns. Many officials tried to dissuade Emperor Ruizong from doing so, but Dou not only pushed for the projects but personally supervised them. He was therefore derogatorily known in a popular couplet as having served as the empress' Azhe and now the princesses' head of household. Soon thereafter, as a part of a major governmental reorganization, he and fellow chancellors Wei Anshi, Guo Yuanzhen, Li Rizhi, and Zhang Shuo were removed from their chancellor posts, and he was again chief imperial censor. In spring 712, however, he again became chancellor with the designation Tong Zhongshu Menxia Sanpin (同中書門下三品).

In summer 712, a fortuneteller told Dou that he was about to suffer disaster. In fear, Dou offered to resign and serve as a servant at Anguo Temple (安國寺). Emperor Ruizong agreed. Several days later, he again made Dou chief imperial censor and Zuo Pushe (左僕射), one of the heads of the executive bureau (尚書省, Shangshu Sheng), and again chancellor with the designation Pingzhang Junguo Zhongshi (平章軍國重事).

== During Emperor Xuanzong's reign ==
In 712, Emperor Ruizong passed the throne to Li Longji, who took the throne (as Emperor Xuanzong). Emperor Ruizong, however, retained actual power as Taishang Huang (retired emperor). Soon after Emperor Xuanzong's assumption of the throne, Cui Shi was made acting Zhongshu Ling (中書令), the head of the legislative bureau and a post considered one for a chancellor. Soon, there was a plan by Liu Yiuqiu, who was a close associate of Emperor Xuanzong's, and the general Zhang Wei (張暐), to kill several chancellors associated with Princess Taiping - Dou, Cui Shi, and Cen Xi. However, the plan was leaked by the censor Deng Guangbin (鄧光賓), who was part of the plot. Emperor Xuanzong disavowed knowledge of the plan, and Liu, Zhang, and Deng were exiled.

By 713, it was said that Princess Taiping, Dou, Cen, Xiao Zhizhong, Cui Shi; along with other officials Xue Ji, Li Jin (李晉) the Prince of Xinxing (a grandson of Li Deliang (李德良), a cousin of Tang's founder Emperor Gaozu), Li You (李猷), Jia Yingfu (賈膺福), Tang Jun (唐晙); the generals Chang Yuankai (常元楷), Li Ci (李慈), and Li Qin (李欽); and the monk Huifan (惠範), were plotting to overthrow Emperor Xuanzong. It was further said that they discussed, with the lady in waiting Lady Yuan to poison the gastrodia elata that Emperor Xuanzong routinely took as an aphrodisiac. When this alleged plot was reported to Emperor Xuanzong by Wei Zhigu, Emperor Xuanzong, who had already received advice from Wang Ju (王琚), Zhang Shuo, and Cui Riyong to act first, did so. He convened a meeting with his brothers Li Fan (李範) the Prince of Qi, Li Ye (李業) the Prince of Xue, Guo Yuanzhen, along with a number of his associates — the general Wang Maozhong (王毛仲), the officials Jiang Jiao (姜皎) and Li Lingwen (李令問), his brother-in-law Wang Shouyi (王守一), the eunuch Gao Lishi, and the military officer Li Shoude (李守德) — and decided to act first. On July 29, Emperor Xuanzong had Wang Maozhong take 300 soldiers to the imperial guard camp to behead Chang and Li Ci. Then, Jia, Li You, Xiao, and Cen were arrested and executed as well. Dou and Princess Taiping committed suicide, with Dou doing so by jumping into a canal. Emperor Xuanzong had Dou's body taken out of the canal and cut off his head. He also posthumously changed Dou's surname to Du (毒, meaning "poison").

It was said that Dou, despite his tendency to flatter powerful individuals, was generous with his clan members, and he often distributed his salary to them. When he died, there was very little asset to be seized.

== Notes and references ==
- New Book of Tang, vol. 109.
- Zizhi Tongjian, vols. 208, 209, 210.
