= Su Gui =

Su Gui (Chinese: 蘇瓌 or 蘇瑰; 639 – 20 August 710), courtesy name Changrong (昌容) or Tingshuo (廷碩), posthumous name Duke Wenzhen of Xu (許文貞公), was an official of the Chinese Tang dynasty and Wu Zhou dynasty, serving as a chancellor during the reigns of Emperor Zhongzong, Emperor Shang, and Emperor Ruizong.

== Background ==
Su Gui was born in 639, during the reign of Emperor Taizong of Tang. He was a great-grandson of the Sui dynasty chancellor Su Wei, and his grandfather Su Kui (蘇夔) and father Su Dan (蘇亶) also served as officials during Sui and its successor Tang dynasty; Su Gui's elder sister was also the wife and crown princess of Emperor Taizong's first crown prince Li Chengqian (although Li had fallen from grace and died by the time Su Gui was about six years old). Su Gui himself passed the imperial examination when he was young (before the age of 19) and was made a military officer at Heng Prefecture (恆州, roughly modern Shijiazhuang, Hebei). When his mother died, his mourning was viewed as so deep and genuine that it got the attention of the chancellor Zhang Da'an, who recommended him for promotion, and he was made a member of the staff of Emperor Gaozong's son Li Dan the Prince of Yu. He was respected by his superiors on Li Dan's staff, Wang Dezhen and Liu Yizhi.

== During Wu Zetian's reign ==
During the reign of Emperor Gaozong's wife Wu Zetian – who seized the throne and claimed the title of "emperor" of a new Zhou dynasty in 690, interrupting Tang—Su Gui successively served as the prefect of Lang Prefecture (朗州, roughly modern Changde, Hunan) and She Prefecture (歙州, roughly modern Huangshan, Anhui). While he was serving as a prefect, the once-powerful secret police official Lai Junchen was demoted and made a military officer under him. Many people warned Su that he needed to pay particular respect to Lai, as he might be recalled and might become powerful again, but Su rebuffed, pointing out that he was Lai's superior, and it was inappropriate for him to flatter someone like Lai. After Lai was recalled in 696, he much resented Su's attitude toward him, and made sure that Su would not himself be recalled to the capital. During Wu Zetian's Chang'an era (701–705) (by which time Lai had died), he was eventually made the secretary general of Yang Prefecture (揚州, roughly modern Yangzhou, Jiangsu) – one of the riches prefectures of the realm, and it was said that his predecessors Zhang Qian (張潛) and Yu Bianji (于辯機) both took much wealth from the prefecture when they left the post, but Su was said to have been so clean that when he left Yang Prefecture to become the prefect of Tong Prefecture (同州, roughly modern Weinan, Shaanxi), he had nothing but a soft mattress in his possession. While Su was at Tong Prefecture, there was a major drought, and the soldiers conscripted from Tong Prefecture thus could not properly prepare for military service. Moreover, at that time, Wu Zetian had sent officials to review governmental actions in the 10 circuits making up the realm, and these officials were strict making sure that the people were submitting taxes and reporting for public works service, much to the distress of the people. Su submitted a petition to Wu Zetian suggesting that those suffering from the drought be exempted from service, and that the circuit-touring officials be recalled. Wu Zetian was said to be pleased with Su, but it is not clear whether she approved his proposal.

== During Emperor Zhongzong's second reign and Emperor Shang's reign ==
In 705, Wu Zetian was overthrown in a coup, and her son Li Xian the Crown Prince (Li Dan's older brother), formerly an emperor, was restored to the throne (as Emperor Zhongzong). Around this time, Su Gui was recalled to serve as Shangshu You Cheng (尚書右丞), one of the secretaries in general at the executive bureau of government (尚書省, Shangshu Sheng) and was created the Baron of Huai. As he was familiar with the laws, he was put in charge of revising the laws, regulations and forms. Later in 705, he was given the honorific title Yinqing Guanglu Daifu (銀青光祿大夫) and made the minister of census (戶部尚書, Hubu Shangshu). One of the reports that he made at the time indicated that there were 6,156,141 households in the realm at that time.

In spring 706, Su was made Shizhong (侍中) – the head of the examination bureau (門下省, Menxia Sheng) and a post considered one for a chancellor. He was also created the greater title of Viscount of Huaiyang. Soon, when Emperor Zhongzong left the capital Chang'an to visit the eastern capital Luoyang, Su was put in charge of Chang'an in Emperor Zhongzong's absence. While Emperor Zhongzong was away, a favorite sorcerer of his, Zheng Pusi (鄭普思), whose wife Lady Diwu was also a sorceress trusted by both Emperor Zhongzong and Emperor Zhongzong's powerful wife Empress Wei and whose daughter was a concubine of Emperor Zhongzong's, was accused of plotting treason. Su arrested Zheng and had his subordinate Fan Xianzhong (范獻忠) investigate further, but once Emperor Zhongzong returned to Chang'an, he issued an edict ordering Su to release Zheng and to end the investigation. Su tried to convince Emperor Zhongzong not to release Zheng—and while they were arguing, Fan made the remark: "Your Imperial Majesty, please behead Su Gui first!" Emperor Zhongzong was surprised and asked why, and Fan responded:

Su Gui was the official in charge of Chang'an, but he could not behead Zheng Pusi first and then report it, and instead allowed Zheng to remain to delude Your Imperial Majesty. This is a capital offense. Further, Zheng's treasonous conduct is clear, yet Your Imperial Majesty twisted the situation to defend him. I, your subject, have heard that someone who is destined to be emperor will never die. This must be it. I would rather that Your Imperial Majesty give me death. I cannot face the north and serve him.

The senior chancellor Wei Yuanzhong then defended Su's actions and further also advocated that Zheng be put to death. Emperor Zhongzong did not do so, but exiled Zheng and executed his associates.

In 707, Emperor Zhongzong's son by a concubine, Li Chongjun the Crown Prince, who could not bear any longer repeated humiliation by his sister, Empress Wei's daughter Li Guo'er the Princess Anle and her husband Wu Chongxun (武崇訓), rose in rebellion and killed Wu Chongxun and his father Wu Sansi the Prince of Dejing (who was also Empress Wei's lover), and then marched on to the palace. At that time, a number of chancellors, including Su, led forces to defend the palace. Li Chongjun was soon defeated and killed in flight.

In 709, when Emperor Zhongzong was set to offer sacrifices to heaven and earth, the principal of the imperial university, Zhu Qinming, and his deputy Guo Shanyun (郭山惲), wanting to flatter Empress Wei and Li Guo'er, proposed that Empress Wei be made the second stage sacrificer and Li Guo'er the third stage sacrificer. Su was one of the officials who opposed this, and ultimately, however, Emperor Zhongzong still let Empress Wei be the second stage sacrificer, although he made the chancellor Wei Juyuan the third stage sacrificer. Soon thereafter, Su was made Shangshu You Pushe (尚書右僕射) – one of the heads of the executive bureau but not considered a chancellor post by this point—but remained chancellor as well, as Emperor Zhongzong gave him the de facto chancellor designation of Tong Zhongshu Menxia Sanpin (同中書門下三品) as well. Su was also created the Duke of Xu. At that time, there was a custom that someone given a high office should offer food to the emperor, and the custom was known as shaowei (燒尾, literally "burning the tail"). Su, however, did not do so, and at a subsequent imperial feast, the official Zong Jinqing (宗晉卿) tried to make fun of him on this issue. Su responded to Emperor Zhongzong:

I, your subject, have heard that chancellors are supposed to harmonize the yin and the yang, and govern over things on behalf of heaven. Right now, food is expensive, and the people do not have enough to eat. I have even seen imperial guards who had not eaten for three days. I am foolish and not doing my job, and therefore I did not dare to carry out shaowei.

Later in 709, Su was also put in charge of editing the imperial history, along with fellow chancellor Tang Xiujing.

In 710, Emperor Zhongzong died suddenly—a death that traditional historians believed to be a poisoning by Empress Wei and Li Guo'er, so that Empress Wei could eventually become "emperor" like Wu Zetian, and Li Guo'er could become crown princess. Meanwhile, however, Empress Wei was set to name another son of Emperor Zhongzong's, Li Chongmao the Prince of Wen, emperor, and under a will drafted for Emperor Zhongzong by Emperor Zhongzong's sister Princess Taiping and his concubine Consort Shangguan Wan'er, Empress Wei would retain power as empress dowager and regent, but Li Dan, now the Prince of Xiang, would be co-regent. Empress Wei, with Emperor Zhongzong's death still kept a secret from the people, convened a meeting of 19 officials, including Wei Anshi, Wei Juyuan, Xiao Zhizhong, Zong Chuke (Zong Jinqing's brother), Ji Chuna, Wei Wen (Empress Wei's cousin), Li Jiao, Wei Sili, Tang Xiujing, Zhao Yanzhao, and Su to discuss the matter. During the meeting, the draft will was discussed, and Zong Chuke and Wei Wen, arguing that it was inappropriate for Li Dan to be co-regent, as traditionally, a brother-in-law was not supposed to speak to a sister-in-law. Su objected, stating, "How can an imperial be altered?" Zong and Wei Wen became visibly angry, and Su did not dare to speak further, and so the provision of having Li Dan serve as co-regent was stricken from the draft will. Li Chongmao took the throne (as Emperor Shang), and Empress Wei served as empress dowager and regent.

Less than a month later, a coup led by Princess Taiping and Li Dan's son Li Longji the Prince of Linzi killed Empress Dowager Wei and Li Guo'er. Under urging by Princess Taiping, Li Longji, and Li Longji's brother Li Chengqi the Prince of Song, Li Dan, who had been himself a former emperor, took the throne again (as Emperor Ruizong), and Emperor Shang was reduced back to being the Prince of Wen.

== During Emperor Ruizong's second reign ==
Emperor Ruizong initially had Su Gui remain in chancellor role, and further slightly promoted him to be Shangshu Zuo Pushe (尚書左僕射) – also head of the executive bureau, but at the time, left (zuo) was a more honored direction than right (you). Su soon asked to retire, however, on account of illness, and he was removed as a chancellor and made a senior advisor to Li Longji, who was created crown prince. He died later in 710 and was buried with honor, but per his directions, in a simple ceremony. His son Su Ting later served as a chancellor during Li Longji's reign.

== Notes and references ==
- Old Book of Tang, vol.88.
- New Book of Tang, vol.125.
- Zizhi Tongjian, vols. 208, 209, 210.
