= Lu Xiangxian =

Lu Xiangxian (陸象先) (665–736), né Lu Jingchu (陸景初), formally Duke Wenzhen of Yan (兗文貞公), was an official of the Chinese Tang dynasty and Wu Zetian's Zhou dynasty, serving as a chancellor during the reigns of Emperor Ruizong and Emperor Xuanzong.

== Background ==
Lu Jingchu was born in 665, during the reign of Emperor Gaozong. His father Lu Yuanfang would eventually serve as chancellor twice during the reign of Emperor Gaozong's wife Wu Zetian. It was said that in his youth, Lu Jingchu was both capable and modest, and after he passed the imperial examinations, was made an officer at Yang Prefecture (揚州, roughly modern Yangzhou, Jiangsu). After his term was complete, he was set to be promoted. At that time, both Ji Xu and his father Lu Yuanfang were deputy ministers of civil service affairs in charge of selecting officials. Ji selected Lu Jingchu to be the sheriff of Luoyang County—not formally a particularly highly placed post but in actuality a highly regarded one, as Luoyang was the capital at the time—and Lu Yuanfang, out of modesty, initially tried to decline on Lu Jingchu's behalf. Ji responded, "It is fair to select officials who are capable. Lu Jingchu is capable and elegant, and common people cannot compare to him. I am not recommending him out of the fact that he is the son of a deputy minister of civil service affairs." Ji went ahead with the recommendation, and Lu Jingchu was made the sheriff of Luoyang County. Lu Jingchu later served as an imperial censor, and then Zhongshu Shilang (中書侍郎), the deputy head of the legislative bureau of government (中書省, Zhongshu Sheng).

== During Emperor Ruizong's second reign ==
In 710, during the reign of Emperor Gaozong's and Wu Zetian's son Emperor Ruizong, Lu Jingchu was made the deputy minister of defense (兵部侍郎, Bingbu Shilang), and it was said that with him and Lu Huaishen serving in that capacity, assisting the minister Yao Yuanzhi, the military officers' promotion system, which was highly damaged by the irregular reign of Emperor Ruizong's brother Emperor Zhongzong (705–710), was repaired.

In 711, Emperor Ruizong's powerful sister Princess Taiping was set to recommend her lover, the official Cui Shi, as chancellor. Cui admired Lu Jingchu greatly, and therefore asked to be promoted along with him. When she initially declined to recommend Lu, Cui responded that he would not dare to be chancellor unless Lu was as well. She therefore recommended both. Thereafter, Lu was given the designation Tong Zhongshu Menxia Pingzhangshi (同中書門下平章事), making him a chancellor de facto, and was also put in charge of editing imperial histories. However, despite the fact that Princess Taiping recommended him, Lu was not considered part of her faction, and while other chancellors often tried to ingratiate her, he did not. Sometime during Emperor Ruizong's reign, Emperor Ruizong changed his name to Xiangxian, citing that the name had the meaning of "elaborating on ancestors' virtues."

== During Emperor Xuanzong's reign ==
In 712, Emperor Ruizong passed the throne to his son Li Longji the Crown Prince (as Emperor Xuanzong) -- who was initially made crown prince despite his not being the oldest son or born of Emperor Ruizong's deceased wife Empress Liu—because Li Longji was instrumental in his return to the throne in 710, having, along with Princess Taiping, started a coup against Empress Wei, Emperor Zhongzong's wife, after Emperor Zhongzong's sudden death in 710. Princess Taiping, finding the new emperor to be difficult to control, advised Emperor Ruizong to continue to wield imperial power as Taishang Huang (retired emperor), and Emperor Ruizong did so.

By 713, the conflict between Princess Taiping and Emperor Xuanzong were coming to a head, and Princess Taiping and her partisans were said to be plotting to depose or kill Emperor Xuanzong and replace him with his older brother Li Chengqi the Prince of Song. She told the chancellors that Li Chengqi was both older and born of Empress Liu and should not have been replaced by a younger brother who was not born of Empress Liu. Lu rebuffed her, however, pointing out that Emperor Xuanzong was made emperor on account of his accomplishments, and that unless he had public faults, he should not be deposed. Princess Taiping did not listen to him, and continued plotting against Emperor Xuanzong. Late in 713, Emperor Xuanzong acted first, using force to kill a number of her associates and forcing her to commit suicide. Emperor Ruizong yielded imperial powers to Emperor Xuanzong and thereafter was not involved in important decisions any more. Among the ones killed were several chancellors she recommended—Cui, Dou Huaizhen, Xiao Zhizhong, and Cen Xi. Initially, Lu was set to be executed as well, but Emperor Xuanzong, knowing that he was not actually a member of Princess Taiping's faction, commented to him, "Only in the cold can one tell that the pine and the cypress are evergreens." He further created Lu the Duke of Yan, gave him the honorific title Yinqing Guanglu Daifu (銀青光祿大夫), and initially had him remain as a chancellor. When Emperor Ruizong heard of the incident, he climbed up the tower at Chengtian Gate (承天門) to try to figure out what was happening, and stated to the officials who gathered, "If you will help me, stay. Otherwise, go." A number of officials stated their names and swore loyalty to Emperor Ruizong—an act that greatly displeased Emperor Xuanzong. He gathered the names and asked Lu to arrest these officials, but Lu burned the list, drawing Emperor Xuanzong's anger. Lu responded:

Attending to an emperor in distress shows faithfulness. Your Imperial Majesty is trying to spread virtues throughout the realm, so why do you kill faithful people? I am an old subject, and I am trying to comfort those who might have opposed you. How would I dare to escape death?

Emperor Xuanzong realized the wisdom in what Lu is doing and praised him. It was said that Lu saved many people accused of being part of Princess Taiping's faction at the time, but did not speak of it, and his actions were not known at that time.

Later in the year, Lu was removed from his chancellor post and made the secretary general at Yi Prefecture (益州, roughly modern Chengdu, Sichuan), as well as the examiner of the Jiannan Circuit (劍南道, roughly modern Sichuan, Yunnan, and Chongqing). While Lu served at Yi Prefecture, he was known for his lenience and kindness. His subordinate Wei Baozhen (韋抱真) once complained that he was being overly lenient and that the people would not respect him, but he responded:

A governor should follow reason. Why should I use harsh penalties to show my power? Hurting others to benefit myself is not the way of kindness and forgiveness.

At a later point, Lu was made the mayor of Hezhong Municipality (河中, roughly modern Yuncheng, Shanxi). In 718, when Hezhong Municipality was disbanded and converted back into Pu Prefecture (蒲州), Lu remained prefect of Pu Prefecture and also made the examiner of Hedong Circuit (河東道, roughly modern Shanxi). It was said that Lu's governance was simple and lenient at Pu Prefecture as well. On one occasion, a minor official committed an error, and Lu rebuked him. A higher ranked subordinate of Lu's suggested that the minor official be caned, but Lu declined, stating, "The emotions of every human are similar. If you think caning is proper, perhaps I should start with you." Another famous saying of Lu's was:

In reality, not much happens under the heavens. Only people of mediocrity stir up trouble, causing the world to be complicated. If people stay still, things will be simple.

(The first two sentences of this quote was eventually simplified and turned into the idiom tianxia ben wushi, yongren zi raozhi (天下本無事, 庸人自擾之).)

Lu was later recalled to serve as Taizi Zhanshi (太子詹事), the head of the household of the crown prince Li Siqian, and yet later served as the minister of public works (工部尚書, Gongbu Shangshu). In 722, he was put in charge of selecting officials at the ministry of civil service affairs, and was further made the minister of justice (刑部尚書, Xingbu Shangshu). He later left public service for a time to observe a mourning period for his stepmother's death. In 725, he returned to public service, to serve as the prefect of Tong Prefecture (同州, roughly modern Weinan, Shaanxi), and was soon made an advisor to the crown prince. He died in 736.

== Notes and references ==
- Old Book of Tang, vol. 88.
- New Book of Tang, vol. 116.
- Zizhi Tongjian, vols. 210, 211, 212.
