= Pei Tan =

Pei Tan may refer to:

- Pei Tan (8th-century Tang chancellor), Tang official who served as chancellor briefly in 710 during the reigns of Emperor Shang and Emperor Ruizong's second reign
- Pei Tan (9th-century Tang chancellor) (died 874), Tang official who served as chancellor briefly in 874 during the reign of Emperor Xizong
