= Wei Anshi =

Tang dynasty official (651-714)

Wei Anshi (Chinese: 韋安石; 651–714), posthumous name Duke Wenzhen of Xun (郇文貞公), was an official of the Chinese Tang dynasty and Wu Zhou dynasty, serving as a chancellor during the reigns of Wu Zetian, her sons Emperor Zhongzong and Emperor Ruizong, and her grandson Emperor Shang.

== Background ==
Wei Anshi was born in 651, early in the reign of Emperor Gaozong. His family was from the Tang dynasty capital Chang'an, and his great-grandfather Wei Xiaokuan was a renowned general for Western Wei and Northern Zhou. His grandfather Wei Jin (韋津) was an official for Northern Zhou's successor and Tang's predecessor Sui dynasty and, after Sui's destruction in 619, served one of the competing claimants for the throne, Wang Shichong the Emperor of Zheng, before eventually surrendering to and serving Tang's founder Emperor Gaozu. Wei Anshi's father Wei Wan (韋琬) and uncles Wei Kun (韋琨) and Wei Sui (韋璲) also served as officials during Tang.

It is not known when it occurred, but at some point Wei Anshi passed the imperial examination and served as the sheriff of Qianfeng County (乾封, in modern Tai'an, Shandong). The high-level official Su Liangsi favored his talent. In 689, by which time Emperor Gaozong's son Emperor Ruizong was emperor (albeit with actual powers in the hands of Emperor Gaozong's powerful wife Empress Wu (later known as Wu Zetian), as empress dowager and regent), Wei was serving as military recruiter at the capital prefecture Yong Prefecture (雍州, roughly modern Xi'an, Shaanxi) and Su was serving as chancellor. Su told him, "You have great talent and should be used for great things. For you to work in local government is a waste." Su then recommended him to Empress Dowager Wu, and Empress Dowager Wu made him a reserve official at the ministry of rites and magistrate of Yongchang County (永昌, one of the two counties making up the eastern capital Luoyang, where Empress Dowager Wu and Emperor Ruizong were at the time), as well as military advisor to the prefect of Bing Prefecture (并州, roughly modern Taiyuan, Shanxi). It was said that Empress Dowager Wu personally issued an edict, "I heard that when you are at your post, you are deliberate in your handling of important matters. I also heard that your good governance was greater than even capable officials, and that your kindness and understanding were renowned among the officials. Your capability greatly comforts me." He was soon made the prefect of Bing Prefecture, and he later served as prefect of De Prefecture (德州, roughly modern Dezhou, Shandong) and then Zheng Prefecture (鄭州, roughly modern Zhengzhou, Henan). He was known for his seriousness, and he rarely laughed. He was also said to be honest and strict, and wherever he was, the people and the subordinates respected and feared him.

== During Wu Zetian's reign ==
In 700, by which time Wu Zetian was carrying the title of "emperor" (after having had Emperor Ruizong yield the throne to her in 690, establishing a new Zhou dynasty and interrupting Tang), Wei Anshi was recalled to then-capital Luoyang to serve as Wenchang You Cheng (文昌右丞), one of the secretaries general at the executive bureau of government (文昌臺, Wenchang Tai), but was soon made Luantai Shilang (鸞臺侍郎), the deputy head of the examination bureau (鸞臺, Luantai) and given the designation Tong Fengge Luantai Pingzhangshi (同鳳閣鸞臺平章事), making him a chancellor de facto. (As part of the commission, a distant relative of Wei Anshi's, Wei Juyuan, was removed from his post as chancellor, as Wu Zetian did not like to have multiple members of the same clan serving as chancellors at the same time.) At that time, Wu Zetian's nephew Wu Sansi and lovers Zhang Yizhi and Zhang Changzong were powerful, and Wei Anshi several times publicly tried to rebuke them. There was an occasion when, at an imperial feast that Wei was attending, Zhang Yizhi brought in several merchants (who were considered of low status under traditional Chinese thinking of the time), led by one Song Bazi (宋霸子), and began gambling with them. Wei kneeled down to Wu Zetian and stated, "Merchants are low in status and should not be allowed to attend imperial gatherings." He then had the guards expel the merchants, and this shocked the people who attended, who were fearful for Wei. However, Wu Zetian, because Wei was being honest and forthright, praised him.

In 703, while Wu Zetian was at Chang'an, she made Wei the official in charge of Luoyang. In 704, she made Wei acting Nayan (納言), the head of the examination bureau and a post considered one for a chancellor. In the fall of that year, he filed an indictment against Zhang Yizhi, and Wu Zetian ordered that he and another chancellor, Tang Xiujing, investigate the case, but before their investigation was complete, Wu Zetian was overthrown in a coup in 705, and Zhang Yizhi and Zhang Changzong were killed in the coup, mooting the investigation.

== During Emperor Zhongzong's second reign ==
After Wu Zetian was overthrown, her son Li Xian the Crown Prince, also a former emperor, was restored to the throne (as Emperor Zhongzong). Soon after Emperor Zhongzong's restoration, Wei Anshi was made the minister of justice (刑部尚書, Xingbu Shangshu), but was no longer a chancellor. Two months later, however, as part of a government reorganization, he was made the minister of civil service affairs (吏部尚書, Libu Shangshu) and given the designation Tong Zhongshu Menxia Sanpin (同中書門下三品), again making him chancellor de facto. A month later, he was made Zhongshu Ling (中書令), the head of the legislative bureau (中書省, Zhongshu Sheng) and a post also considered one for a chancellor. He was also created the Duke of Xun and made the secretary general of Emperor Zhongzong's brother Li Dan (the former Emperor Ruizong) the Prince of Xiang.

In spring 706, Wei was made the minister of the treasury (戶部尚書, Hubu Shangshu), no longer a chancellor. In 709, he was made Shizhong (侍中, the new title for the head of the examination bureau (now named Menxia Sheng (門下省)) and was therefore chancellor again.

== During Emperor Shang's reign and Emperor Ruizong's second reign ==
In 710, while Wei Anshi served as chancellor, Emperor Zhongzong suddenly died—a death that traditional historians believed to be a poisoning carried out by Emperor Zhongzong's powerful wife Empress Wei and daughter Li Guo'er the Princess Anle, so that Empress Wei could eventually be emperor like Wu Zetian and Li Guo'er could become crown princess. For the time being, however, Emperor Zhongzong's son by a concubine, Li Chongmao the Prince of Wen, was made emperor (as Emperor Shang), with Empress Wei serving as empress dowager and regent. Less than a month later, a coup led by Emperor Zhongzong's sister Princess Taiping and nephew Li Longji the Prince of Linzi (Li Dan's son) killed Empress Wei and Li Guo'er. In short order, Emperor Shang was deposed, and Li Dan returned to the throne. Shortly after Emperor Ruizong's return to the throne, Wei Anshi was removed from his post as Shizhong and made an advisor to Li Longji, now crown prince, as well as Zuo Pushe (左僕射), one of the heads of the executive bureau (now named Shangshu Sheng (尚書省)).

As of 711, discord began to develop between Li Longji and Princess Taiping, as they vied in their struggle to influence Emperor Ruizong. Traditional historians believed that Princess Taiping was beginning to gather a faction of officials around her, intending to find fault with Li Longji as to remove him from being crown prince. She tried to include Wei in her faction, repeatedly having her son-in-law Tang Jun (唐晙) invite him to her mansion, but he repeatedly declined. On one occasion, when Emperor Ruizong met with Wei alone, he told Wei, "I have heard that the officials are all loyal only to the Eastern Palace [(i.e., the Crown Prince, as the Eastern Palace was the residence for the crown prince)]. You should investigate this." Wei responded:

Where did Your Imperial Majesty hear this kind of empire-destroying words? This must be a plot by Princess Taiping. The Crown Prince had accomplished great things for the state, is kind and understanding, and is filially pious and loving to his brothers. Everyone knows this. I hope that Your Imperial Majesty would not be misled by wrongful accusations.

Emperor Ruizong was surprised and took no further action and only said:

I understand, you do not need to repeat this.

However, Princess Taiping Was behind a pearl screen behind Emperor Ruizong and heard this, and she spread rumors against Wei, hoping that he would be arrested and tried, but the chancellor Guo Yuanzhen stopped the investigations into Wei. Later that year, after the chancellors Yao Chong and Song Jing were removed for having proposed that Princess Taiping be settled outside the capital and that two princes with potential claims to be crown prince -- Li Chengqi the Prince of Song (Li Longji's older brother, who was also born of Emperor Ruizong's deceased wife Empress Liu whereas Li Longji was born of Emperor Ruizong's concubine Consort Dou) and Li Shouli the Prince of Bin (the oldest son of Emperor Ruizong's older brother Li Xian (note different character than Emperor Ruizong)) be sent out of the capital to serve as prefectural prefects, Wei again became Shizhong and was said to be largely in charge of civil service affairs, along with Li Rizhi. It was said that under Wei's and Li Rizhi's oversight, the civil service affairs, which had fallen into a state of confusion during Emperor Zhongzong's reign and which Song and Yao had tried to streamline, again became unwieldy. Soon thereafter, Wei was again made Zhongshu Ling. Four months later, he was made advisor to Li Longji and Zuo Pushe (左僕射, also a head of the executive bureau), but retained chancellor status with the designation Tong Zhongshu Menxia Sanpin. It was said that, however, his actual powers were limited, as Princess Taiping, who was extremely influential on Emperor Ruizong's decisions at the time, seeing that Wei would not join her faction, decided to pile honors and titles on him but strip him of actual authority. Three months later, as part of a major governmental reorganization, Wei, along with Guo, Dou Huaizhen, Li Rizhi, and Zhang Shuo, were removed from their chancellor posts, with Wei acting only as Zuo Pushe and also put in charge of Luoyang (the capital having been moved back to Chang'an when Emperor Zhongzong returned to the throne).

== During Emperor Xuanzong's reign ==
Sometime after Wei was removed from his chancellor post, his daughter, who had married the junior official Li Yuancheng (李元澄), died. Wei's wife Lady Xue suspected a servant girl of Li Yuancheng's, with whom Li Yuancheng had a sexual relationship but who had since married another person, had murdered her daughter, and therefore had people seize the servant girl and pound her to death. The imperial censor Yang Maoqian (楊茂謙) submitted an indictment against Wei, and he was demoted to be the prefect of Pu Prefecture (蒲州, roughly modern Yuncheng, Shanxi), and then moved to Qing Prefecture (青州, modern Weifang, Shandong). While Wei was at Pu Prefecture, Jiang Jiao (姜皎), an official who was particularly close to Li Longji, who had become emperor in 712 (as Emperor Xuanzong) when Emperor Ruizong decided to retire, made requests to Wei, which Wei rejected, drawing Jiang's ire.

In 714, Jiang Jiao's brother Jiang Hui (姜晦), then imperial censor, pointing out that at the time that Wei Wen and Zong Chuke altered Emperor Zhongzong's will to remove Emperor Ruizong as coregent, Wei Anshi, Wei Sili, Zhao Yanzhao, and Li Jiao were all chancellors and did nothing to stop them, had his subordinate Guo Zhen (郭震) file an indictment against the former chancellors. These former chancellors were all demoted, with Wei Anshi reduced to being the secretary general of Mian Prefecture (沔州, in modern Wuhan, Hubei). Once Wei Anshi arrived at Mian Prefecture, Jiang Hui then filed another indictment, accusing Wei Anshi of having embezzled governmental property while being in charge of building Emperor Zhongzong's tomb, and he sent investigators to Mian Prefecture to investigate. Wei Anshi sighed and said, "They just want me to die." He soon died in anger and fear. Later in the reign of Emperor Xuanzong, when his son Wei Zhi (韋陟) had become a powerful official, he was posthumously conferred a number of honors, including the restoration of the title of Duke of Xun.

== Notes and references ==
- Old Book of Tang, vol. 92.
- New Book of Tang, vol. 122.
- Zizhi Tongjian, vols. 207, 208, 209, 210, 211.
