= Zhong Shaojing =

Zhong Shaojing (Chinese: 鍾紹京), courtesy name Keda (可大), noble title Duke of Yue (越國公), was an official of the Tang dynasty and Wu Zhou dynasty of China, briefly serving as a chancellor during the reign of Emperor Ruizong.

== Background ==
It is not known when Zhong Shaojing was born, but it is known that he was from Qian Prefecture (虔州, roughly modern Ganzhou, Jiangxi). His clan traced its ancestry to a number of officials of Han dynasty, Cao Wei, Jin dynasty (266–420), Northern Wei, Southern Qi, Liang dynasty, Sui dynasty, and Tang dynasty. Both Zhong Shaojing's great-grandfather Zhong Baoshen (鍾寶慎) and grandfather Zhong Ziwei (鍾子威), however, were only minor local officials, and Zhong Shaojing's father Zhong Fazun (鍾法遵) did not carry any official titles. In Zhong Shaojing's youth, during the reign of Wu Zetian, he served as a Sinong Lushi (司農錄事), a low-level official at the ministry of agriculture, but as he was well known for his calligraphy, was requested by the legislative bureau of government (鳳閣, Fengge) to serve there. Many plaques of important public works projects built during Wu Zetian's reign, including the imperial meeting hall (明堂, Mingtang) and the palaces, and the odes to the nine dings that Wu Zetian built, were physically written by Zhong.

== Participation in coup of 710 ==
As of the Jinglong era (707-710) of Wu Zetian's son Emperor Zhongzong, Zhong Shaojing was serving as the director of imperial gardens (苑總監, Yuan Zongjian). In 710, Emperor Zhongzong died suddenly—a death that traditional historians believed to be a poisoning carried out by his powerful wife Empress Wei and her daughter Li Guo'er the Princess Anle, so that Empress Wei could become "emperor" like Wu Zetian and Li Guo'er could become crown princess. For the time being, Emperor Zhongzong's son by a concubine, Li Chongmao the Prince of Wen, was made emperor (as Emperor Shang), and Empress Wei retained power as empress dowager and regent. She viewed Emperor Zhongzong's brother Li Dan the Prince of Xiang and sister Princess Taiping as threats, and considered killing them. Meanwhile, Princess Taiping and Li Dan's son Li Longji the Prince of Linzi heard news of this, and therefore considered acting first. They, along with Princess Taiping's son Xue Chongjian (薛崇簡), Zhong, Wang Chongye (王崇曄), Liu Youqiu, and Ma Sizong (麻嗣宗), planned a coup, and soon launched it, with support from imperial guard soldiers disgruntled at harsh treatment by their commanders Wei Bo (韋播) and Gao Song (高嵩), Empress Wei's nephews whom she had put in charge. Zhong was set to join the coup with the servants and laborers of the imperial gardens, but almost did not do so as he suddenly hesitated, only resolving to join the coup after his wife pointed out that if the coup failed, he would suffer death anyway. The coup was successful, and Empress Wei and Li Guo'er were killed. Li Dan was made regent, and for his contributions in the coup, Zhong was made Zhongshu Shilang (中書侍郎), the deputy head of the legislative bureau (中書省, Zhongshu Sheng), and given the designation Canzhi Jiwu (參知機務), making him a chancellor de facto. He was also given the honorific title Yinqing Guanglu Daifu (銀青光祿大夫). The next day, he was given the greater chancellor de facto designation of Tong Zhongshu Menxia Sanpin (同中書門下三品).

== During Emperor Ruizong's reign ==
Several days after the coup, Li Dan, at the urging of Princess Taiping, Li Longji, and Li Longji's brother Li Chengqi the Prince of Song, retook the throne (as Emperor Ruizong), displacing Emperor Shang. Once Emperor Ruizong took the throne, Zhong received further promotions and honors—he was made Zhongshu Ling (中書令) -- the head of the legislative bureau and a post considered one for a chancellor—and created the Duke of Yue. He was also given awards of silk, servants, a mansion, land, horses, and other assorted treasures. It was said that, however, that other officials disrespected Zhong for his past as a low-level official and despised him for carrying out actions based on his own wishes and desires. The official Xue Ji suggested to him that he demonstrate modesty by offering to resign—something often done when high level officials are commissioned and mostly done ceremonially—and when Zhong did, Xue entered the palace and persuaded Emperor Ruizong to accept the resignation. Emperor Ruizong did, and he made Zhong the minister of census (戶部尚書, Hubu Shangshu), and later the prefect of Shu Prefecture (蜀州, in modern Chengdu, Sichuan).

== During Emperor Xuanzong's reign ==
In 712, Emperor Ruizong passed the throne to Li Longji, who took the throne as Emperor Xuanzong. Sometime after, Zhong Shaojing was recalled to again serve as minister of census, and later the head of the crown prince's household (太子詹事, Taizi Zhanshi). (As there was no crown prince at that time, the title was entirely honorary.) However, the chancellor Yao Chong disliked Zhong, and he accused Zhong and Liu Youqiu of complaining that they were not given important positions despite their contributions. Despite their denials, they were still demoted—in Zhong's case, to be the prefect of Guo Prefecture (果州, roughly modern Nanchong, Sichuan). At a later point, he was further accused of offenses and demoted to be the sheriff of Huai'en County (懷恩, in modern Zhangzhou, Fujian), and his titles were stripped. He subsequently served as the secretary general of Wen Prefecture (溫州, roughly modern Wenzhou, Zhejiang).

In 727, Zhong visited the capital Chang'an, and had the opportunity to meet Emperor Xuanzong. He wept and stated:

Does Your Imperial Majesty not remember what had happened in the past? Why do you abandon me to the wilderness, forever away from the palace? Further, those who had accomplishments at the time are now all deceased except this old subject of yours. Do you not have kindness for me?

Emperor Xuanzong was saddened, and immediately made Zhong Yinqing Guanglu Daifu and Taizi You Yude (太子右諭德), a member of the staff of the crown prince Li Hong. Some time thereafter, he was made Taizi Shao Zhanshi (太子少詹事), the deputy head of the crown prince's household. He died in his 80s while still serving in that position, although the year is not known.

It was said that Zhong, in addition to being a famed calligrapher, also favored collecting calligraphy. Among his collections were several hundred works of Wang Xizhi, Wang Xianzhi, and Chu Suiliang. Three of his sons, Zhong Jiabi (鍾嘉璧), Zhong Jia'e (鍾嘉諤), and Zhong Jiawei (鍾嘉偉) served as officials.

== Notes and references ==
- Old Book of Tang, vol. 97.
- New Book of Tang, vol. 121.
- Zizhi Tongjian, vols. 208, 209, 210, 211.
