= Empress Zhaocheng =

Empress Zhaocheng (昭成皇后) was the concubine of Emperor Ruizong of Tang and the mother of Emperor Xuanzong of Tang.

== Life ==
She is the great-granddaughter of Dou Kang, a member of the Dou Clan who was related to Empress Taimu, the consort of Emperor Gaozu. Her grandfather Dou Dan was a scholar and her father Dou XiaoChen was a military governor. Dou was known to be beautiful, graceful and dynamic.

Her birth is not recorded in history. But in the first year reign of Ruizong of Tang, she was canonized as a concubine. The year after, Concubine Dou gave birth to Li Longji (the future Emperor Xuanzong). Afterwards, she gave birth to two more children, the Seventh Princess Jinxian (金仙公主) and the Eighth Princess Yuzhen (玉真公主). When Wu Zetian deposed Emperor Ruizong, she and the Emperor's family moved to the East Palace.

In 693, a servant girl falsely accused Dou and Empress Liu of using witchcraft to curse Emperor Wu. On the second day of the first lunar month, Concubine Dou and Empress Liu met with Wu Zetian in Jiayu Palace. They were allegedly killed by Wu Zetian and their remains remain undiscovered. Her younger sister Dou Shu took on the responsibility of raising Li Longji as the boy had lost his mother at a young age.

After the death of Emperor Ruizong, because Dou was the mother of the successor emperor she was posthumously named the Empress Dowager. Dou's relatives including Dou Shu were treated favorably by the Emperor. The four sons of her sister Deng Guo: Zhang Qudou, Zhang Quyu, Zhang Qushe, and Zhang Quyi were all high officials. And later Zhang Quyu's daughter would later become the Empress Zhang of Emperor Suzong of Tang. The brothers of the Dou family, Dou Xiyan, Dou Xiqiu, and Dou Xihuan, were all knighted and were with received with the greatest honors. However, all three of her brothers had very bad reputations. Dou Xiguan was particularly arrogant and domineering, but he was still favored by Xuanzong, so much so that Xuanzong's daughter, the Princess Changle was married to Dou Xiguan's son. Dou Xiyan's fourth daughter even became the Princess of the eldest son of Li Longji.
