= Li Jin (Tang dynasty) =

Li Jin was an imperial prince and member of the royal family in the Tang dynasty. He was the eldest son of crown prince Li Chengqi (also known as Li Xian), and grandson of Emperor Ruizong. Li Jin's father, Li Chengqi, yielded his claim to the throne to his younger brother, Li Longji, who eventually became Emperor Xuánzong of Tang. Li Jin was adored by his uncle, the Emperor Xuánzong, who personally taught him to play music. He also gave him a prominent position in the government, and the title Prince of Ruyang. Li Jin "excelled at poetry and calligraphy, carrying himself with scholarly bearing." He was skilled at playing the drum, and was also known for his ability in archery. Li Jin had a number of siblings, among them, Li Yu, and Li Xiang, who is the father of Li Shizhi mentioned with Li Jin in Du Fu's infamous poem, "The Eight Immortals of the Wine Cup".

== Friendship with Du Fu ==
Li Jin is best known for being "immortalized" by the famous poet, Du Fu. He was listed in the second place in Du Fu's poem Eight Immortals of the Wine Cup through the following lines:

汝阳三斗始朝天， (He can drink three big barrels before drunk)
道逢麴车口流涎， (He can't resist the temper of drinking when seeing the carts transporting Chinese white wine on his way)
恨不移封向酒泉。 (that he would rather move his mansion to Jiuquan, the place where wines are produced.)

Du Fu and Li Jin were part of a group of scholar-officials and literati friends, who all enjoyed drinking as well as writing together. Du Fu even dedicated a poem to Li Jin, "Twenty Two Rhymes Given to Li Jin, the Prince of Ru Yang".
