= Empress Lu (Tang dynasty) =

Empress of China in 710

Empress Lu (陸皇后, personal name unknown) was briefly an empress of the Chinese dynasty Tang dynasty in 710. Her husband was Emperor Shang (Li Chongmao).

Very little is known about her. It is known that when Li Chongmao was the Prince of Wen under his father Emperor Zhongzong, she was the Princess of Wen. In 710, after Emperor Zhongzong's sudden death—a death that traditional historians believed to be a poisoning carried out by Emperor Zhongzong's wife Empress Wei and daughter Li Guo'er the Princess Anle—Li Chongmao was made emperor, although Empress Wei retained power as empress dowager and regent. Princess Lu was created empress. Less than a month later, Emperor Zhongzong's sister Princess Taiping and nephew Li Longji the Prince of Linzi rose in rebellion and killed Empress Dowager Wei and Li Guo'er. Emperor Shang was subsequently reduced back to princely rank, and Li Longji's father Li Dan the Prince of Xiang became emperor (as Emperor Ruizong). Nothing further was mentioned about Empress Lu, although presumably she became Princess of Wen again. It is not known whether she survived Li Chongmao, who died in 714 without a son, whether by her or any other consort.

Chinese royalty
Preceded by Empress Wei	Empress of Tang Dynasty; 710	Succeeded by Empress Wang
