= Emperor Shang of Tang =

Emperor of the Tang dynasty in 710

Emperor Shang of Tang 唐殤帝

Emperor of the Tang dynasty
- Reign: 8 July – 25 July 710 (17 days)
- Predecessor: Emperor Zhongzong (under Empress Wei's shadow)
- Successor: Emperor Ruizong (under Princess Taiping and Li Longji's shadow)
- Regent: Empress Dowager Wei

Prince of Beihai Commendary
- Reign: 700–705

Prince of Wen
- Reign: 705–710

Prince of Xiang
- Reign: 711–714
- Born: 695 or 698
- Died: 5 September 714 (aged 15–19)
- Consorts: Lady Lu (disappeared 710)
Names
- Family name: Lǐ (李); Given name: Chóngmào (重茂)
Era dates
- Tánglóng (唐隆, 5 July 710 – 19 August 710
Posthumous name
- Emperor Shang (殤皇帝)
- House: Li
- Dynasty: Tang
- Father: Emperor Zhongzong

Tang Shangdi
- Chinese: 唐殤帝
- Literal meaning: "Tang Emperor who died in childhood"
Transcriptions
Standard Mandarin
- Hanyu Pinyin: Táng Shāngdì

Beihaijun Wang
- Chinese: 北海郡王
- Literal meaning: Prince of Beihai Commandery
Transcriptions
Standard Mandarin
- Hanyu Pinyin: Běihǎijùn Wáng

Wen Wang
- Chinese: 溫王
- Literal meaning: Prince of Wen
Transcriptions
Standard Mandarin
- Hanyu Pinyin: Wēn Wáng

Xiang Wang
- Chinese: 襄王
- Literal meaning: Prince of Xiang
Transcriptions
Standard Mandarin
- Hanyu Pinyin: Xiāng Wáng

Li Chongmao
- Chinese: 李重茂
- Literal meaning: (personal name)
Transcriptions
Standard Mandarin
- Hanyu Pinyin: Lǐ Chóngmào

Emperor Shang of Tang (695 or 698 – 5 September 714), also known as Emperor Shao (少帝), personal name Li Chongmao, was the seventh emperor of the Tang dynasty of China, ruling briefly in 710.

Li Chongmao was the youngest son of Emperor Zhongzong, born to one of Zhongzong's concubines. As of 710, Empress Wei and her daughter Li Guo'er the Princess Anle were exceedingly powerful, but Li Guo'er was unable to convince Emperor Zhongzong to have her created crown princess. Empress Wei, meanwhile, wanted to become Empress Regnant like her mother-in-law, Emperor Zhongzong's mother Wu Zetian. Traditional historians believed that she and Li Guo'er poisoned Emperor Zhongzong in July 710 although it may have been a stroke or heart attack that killed Emperor Zhongzong. Empress Wei then arranged for Li Chongmao, then the Prince of Wen, to succeed Emperor Zhongzong as emperor, hoping to control the young teenager as empress dowager and regent.

Empress Dowager Wei's plans, however, were foiled when Emperor Zhongzong's sister Princess Taiping and nephew Li Longji the Prince of Linzi launched a coup less than a month after Emperor Shang's enthronement. Both Empress Wei and Li Guo'er were killed during the coup, and on July 25 the young emperor was forced to cede the imperial throne to Li Longji's father Li Dan the Prince of Xiang, a former emperor (as Emperor Ruizong).

Li Chongmao, who had been emperor for only 17 days, was reverted to a princely rank and sent away from the capital Chang'an. He died four years later without having returned to the capital. Immediately after his death, Li Longji, who had by then succeeded his father Emperor Ruizong (as Emperor Xuanzong), restored Li Chongmao's imperial dignity and gave him the posthumous name Shang which literally means "died at an early age." Li Chongmao is also known in histories as Emperor Shao, which literally means "the young emperor." Most traditional historians did not consider him a legitimate emperor and do not include him in the list of emperors of the Tang dynasty, although modern historians usually do.

== Background ==
Li Chongmao was either born in 695—during a time when his father Li Xian, who was formerly an emperor of the Tang dynasty but was deposed in 694, was in exile and carried the title of Prince of Luling—or in 698—after Li Xian had been recalled to then-capital Luoyang by Li Chongmao's grandmother Wu Zetian, then reigning as Empress Regnant, to be crown prince. His mother was a concubine of Li Xian's, but nothing, including her name, is written in official histories about her background. In 700, Wu Zetian created him the Prince of Beihai.

== During Emperor Zhongzong's second reign ==
In 705, Wu Zetian was overthrown in a coup, and Li Xian was restored (as Emperor Zhongzong). He created Li Chongmao the greater title of Prince of Wen. Li Chongmao was also made titularly a commanding general of the imperial guards and the commandant at Bing Prefecture (并州, roughly modern Taiyuan, Shanxi), but did not actually report to Bing Prefecture and remained in the palace. Sometime during his stint as Prince of Wen, he married a Lady Lu as his wife and princess.

== Brief reign ==
In 710, Emperor Zhongzong died suddenly—a death that traditional historians believed to be a poisoning by his powerful wife Empress Wei and daughter Li Guo'er the Princess Anle, so that Empress Wei could become "emperor" like Wu Zetian and Li Guo'er could become crown princess. Her final ambitions notwithstanding, Empress Wei named Li Chongmao emperor (as Emperor Shang), but retained power as empress dowager and regent. His wife Princess Lu was created empress.

Less than a month later, believing that Empress Dowager Wei would act against them, Emperor Zhongzong's sister Princess Taiping and nephew Li Longji the Prince of Linzi rose in rebellion, killing Empress Dowager Wei and Li Guo'er. Li Longji's father Li Dan the Prince of Xiang, himself a former emperor, became regent instead, and the popular sentiment at the time called for Li Dan to return to the throne. When eunuchs and ladies in waiting attending to the young Emperor Shang requested that one of the coup leaders who became a chancellor immediately after the coup, Liu Youqiu, draft an edict to let Emperor Shang to honor his mother as empress dowager, Liu refused and hinted that Li Dan should be emperor, and while Li Longji publicly told Liu not to speak any further, Li Longji, his brother Li Chengqi the Prince of Song, and Princess Taiping were trying to persuade Li Dan to take the throne. Several days later, Li Dan agreed, and he took the throne, displacing Emperor Shang, who was still sitting on the throne during the ceremony and whom Princess Taiping grabbed by the collar to pull down from the throne. He was again given the title of Prince of Wen.

== After reign ==
After Li Chongmao's removal from the throne, he was initially housed inside the palace to prevent anyone from using him to start a coup. In 711, he was given the title of Prince of Xiang and made the prefect of Ji Prefecture (集州, roughly modern Bazhong, Sichuan). 500 imperial guards were sent to accompany and watch him. In 714, by which time Li Longji was emperor (as Emperor Xuanzong), Li Chongmao died. Li Longji restored his imperial status and gave him the posthumous name of Shang, and observed a three-day mourning period, but not the customary three years for the death of an emperor. He appeared to be sonless, as while his older brother Li Chongjun, who died in 707, was listed with a son, he was not.

== Chancellors during reign ==
- Wei Anshi (710)
- Tang Xiujing (710)
- Wei Juyuan (710)
- Li Jiao (710)
- Su Gui (710)
- Zong Chuke (710)
- Ji Chuna (710)
- Xiao Zhizhong (710)
- Zhang Renyuan (710)
- Wei Sili (710)
- Zhao Yanzhao (710)
- Wei Wen (710)
- Zhang Xi (710)
- Pei Tan (710)
- Cui Shi (710)
- Cen Xi (710)
- Zhang Jiafu (710)
- Li Dan (710)
- Liu Youqiu (710)
- Zhong Shaojing (710)
- Li Longji (710)
- Li Rizhi (710)

== Consorts ==
- Princess consort, of the Lu clan (王妃 陸氏)

== See also ==
1. Chinese emperors family tree (middle)

Emperor Shang of Tang House of Li Born: 695 or 698 Died: 5 September 714
Regnal titles
Preceded by Emperor Zhongzong of Tang	Emperor of the Tang dynasty 710 with Empress Dowager Wei	Succeeded by Emperor Ruizong of Tang
