= Wei Hongmin =

Wei Hongmin (韋弘敏) was briefly a 7th-century chancellor of the Chinese Tang dynasty, during the first reigns of Emperor Zhongzong and Emperor Ruizong (both of whom reigned twice).

Very little is known about Wei Hongmin's life or career, as, unusual for a chancellor, he did not have a biography in either the Old Book of Tang or the New Book of Tang. He was from Duling (杜陵, in modern Xi'an, Shaanxi).

Emperor Zhongzong had taken the throne late in 683 after the death of his father Emperor Gaozong. In spring 684, he made Wei Hongmin, who was then Zuo Sanqi Changshi (左散騎常侍), a chief advisor at the examination bureau of government (門下省, Menxia Sheng), to be the minister of palace supplies (太府卿, Taifu Qing), and also gave him the designation of Tong Zhongshu Menxia Sanpin (同中書門下三品), making him a chancellor de facto. (Some modern historical discussions make much of the fact that he was distant relative of Emperor Zhongzong's wife Empress Wei, although the actual significance of this very distant relationship—Empress Wei's great-great-grandfather Wei Yi (韋議) shared a 10th generation ancestor, the Cao Wei official Wei Zhou (韋冑), with Wei Hongmin—was not stated in official histories.) In spring 684, after Emperor Zhongzong showed signs of independence from his powerful mother Empress Dowager Wu (later known as Wu Zetian), Empress Dowager Wu deposed him and reduced him to the title of Prince of Lulin, replacing him with his brother Li Dan the Prince of Yu (as Emperor Ruizong).

After Emperor Ruizong took the throne, Wei Hongmin remained chancellor for about eight more months, but in winter 684 was demoted to the post of prefect of Fen Prefecture (汾州, roughly modern Linfen, Shanxi) -- on the same day that another chancellor, Liu Jingxian, was demoted for having defended fellow chancellor Pei Yan against accusations of treason, although there was no indication in historical accounts that Wei's demotion was also related to defending Pei. There were no further records about Wei in history.

== Notes and references ==
- Zizhi Tongjian, vol. 203.(in Chinese)
