= Li Rizhi =

Chinese chancellor

Li Rizhi (Chinese: 李日知) (died 715) was an official of the Chinese Tang dynasty and Wu Zetian's Zhou dynasty, serving as a chancellor during the reign of Emperor Ruizong.

== Background ==
It is not known when Li Rizhi was born, but it is known that his family was from Zheng Prefecture (鄭州, roughly modern Zhengzhou, Henan). His family traced its ancestry to the great Warring States period Zhao general Li Mu. At some point, Li passed the imperial examinations.

== During Wu Zetian's reign ==
During Wu Zetian's Tianshou era (690-692), he served as a Sixing Cheng (司刑丞) -- a judge at the supreme court. It was said that at that time, the judges were often cruel, but Li was kind and tried to avoid unjust penalties for defendants. In one case, he spared a defendant from death, but the deputy chief judge, Hu Yuanli (胡元禮) ordered that the defendant be executed. They exchanged dissenting paperwork between themselves four times. Eventually, Hu angrily stated, "As long as I am still here, this defendant will not be spared." Li responded, "As long as I am still here, this defendant will not be executed." They both submitted their opinions to Wu Zetian, and she decided in favor of Li.

== During Emperor Zhongzong's second reign ==
Later, during the Shenlong era (705-707) of Wu Zetian's son Emperor Zhongzong, Li Rizhi served as Jishizhong (給事中), an imperial attendant. At that time, his mother was old and ill, and Li personally attended to her and was so worried that his hair turned white. Sometime thereafter, he was given the honorific title Chaosan Daifu (朝散大夫), and Emperor Zhongzong was poised to grant his mother a title as well. However, she died before she could be so honored. As she was set to be buried, the imperial messenger arrived with his mother's commission, and he was so overwhelmed by emotions that he fainted. The official sent to review matters in the circuit that Zheng Prefecture belonged to, Jing Qian (敬濳), heard of this, and was set to report to the emperor Li's great filial piety, but Li declined. After he finished observing the mourning period for his mother, he was recalled to government service to serve as Huangmen Shilang (黃門侍郎), the deputy head of the examination bureau of government (門下省, Menxia Sheng).

In 709, Emperor Zhongzong's powerful daughter Li Guo'er the Princess Anle had just completed building a new mansion and a magnificent artificial pond that she named Dingkun Pond (定昆池). Emperor Zhongzong personally visited her mansion, and the officials attending to him all wrote poems praising the beauty of the pond. Li Rizhi, however, wrote a poem that had the tenor of trying to correct her behavior, including the lines:

I wish the person who lives here briefly can relax.

Do not forget the labors of those who built this place.

These lines became well known. (Later, Emperor Zhongzong's brother Li Dan the Prince of Xiang, after he became emperor in 710, would comment to Li Rizhi, "At that time, not even I dared to say something like that.)

== During Emperor Shang's reign and Emperor Ruizong's second reign ==
In 710, Emperor Zhongzong died suddenly -- a death that traditional historians believed to be a poisoning carried out by his wife Empress Wei and Li Guo'er, so that Empress Wei could become "emperor" like Wu Zetian, and Li Guo'er could become crown princess. Meanwhile, Emperor Zhongzong's son by a concubine, Li Chongmao the Prince of Wen was named emperor (as Emperor Shang), but Empress Wei retained power as empress dowager and regent. Less than a month later, Emperor Zhongzong's sister Princess Taiping and Li Dan's son Li Longji the Prince of Linzi rose in rebellion and killed Empress Dowager Wei and Li Guo'er. Li Dan became regent, and he gave Li Rizhi the designation Tong Zhongshu Menxia Sanpin (同中書門下三品), making him a de facto chancellor. Several days later, Li Dan, who was formerly emperor, took the throne again himself (as Emperor Ruizong), displacing Emperor Shang.

In spring 711, after fellow chancellors Yao Yuanzhi and Song Jing were removed from office, Li Rizhi and Wei Anshi became the lead chancellors, and it was said that the reforms that Yao and Song tried to carry out after Emperor Zhongzong's reign were reversed, and that the government was disorganized. Later that year, Li Rizhi was made acting Shizhong (侍中), the head of the examination bureau and a post considered one for a chancellor. In winter 711, as a part of a major governmental reorganization, Li Rizhi and fellow chancellors Wei, Guo Yuanzhen, Dou Huaizhen, and Zhang Shuo were removed from their chancellor posts, and Li became the minister of census (戶部尚書, Hubu Shangshu).

== During Emperor Xuanzong's reign ==
In 712, Emperor Ruizong passed the throne to Li Longji, who took the throne as Emperor Xuanzong. Later that year, Li Rizhi, who was then the minister of justice (刑部尚書), requested retirement, and the request was approved. Prior to making the request, he did not tell his wife, and when he returned home, he began to prepare moving to a country residence. His wife, surprised, stated, "We do not have much asset, and your sons and brothers have not had a chance to become officials in government. Why do you wish to resign?" He responded, "I am a simple scholar, and what I have already exceeds what I should have. Human desires can never be fulfilled, and I should not pamper my heart." Once he retired to the countryside, he did not spend time managing assets, but rather built ponds and pavilions, and often invited younger scholars to discuss things with them. He died in 715.

It was said that Li Rizhi, contrary to the harshness of supervising officials at the time, never caned his subordinates for faults. On one occasion, a low-level official at the ministry of justice received an imperial edict but forgot to act on it for three days. Li Rizhi became angry and took a cane. After gathering the subordinates, he acted as if he would cane the forgetful subordinate, but then stated, "If I caned you, everyone will state that you are so negligent that you even drew Li Rizhi's anger and was caned by him. Everyone will shame you, and even your wife will abandon you." He then released the subordinate from punishment, and the man and the other subordinates were thankful. However, Li was also criticized for having all of his sons take wives from prominent clans. After his death, his youngest son Li Yiheng (李伊衡) promoted a concubine to be his wife—an act considered highly violative of Confucian principles—and was wasteful and litigious toward his brothers, causing the reputation of the clan to suffer greatly.

== Notes and references ==
- Old Book of Tang, vol. 188.
- New Book of Tang, vol. 116.
- Zizhi Tongjian, vols. 204, 209, 210.
