= Xiao Zhizhong =

Chinese Tang dynasty chancellor (died 713)

Xiao Zhizhong (Chinese: 蕭至忠; died July 29, 713?) was an official of the Chinese Tang dynasty and Wu Zetian's Zhou dynasty, serving as a chancellor during the reigns of Wu Zetian's sons Emperor Zhongzong and Emperor Ruizong and grandsons Emperor Shang and Emperor Xuanzong. He was known for his willingness to point out corruption in high-level officials, but was later himself implicated as a partisan of the powerful Princess Taiping (Emperors Zhongzong's and Ruizong's sister) and executed in 713 when Emperor Xuanzong suppressed Princess Taiping's party.

== Background ==
It is not known when Xiao Zhizhong was born, but it is known that his family was from Yi Prefecture (沂州, roughly modern Linyi, Shandong). His family traced its ancestry back to Xiao Zhuo (蕭卓), the father of Liu Song empress dowager Xiao Wenshou, the stepmother of Liu Song's founding emperor Emperor Wu of Song. Xiao Zhuo's line then served as officials for Liu Song and its succeeding Southern dynasties Southern Qi, Liang dynasty, and Chen dynasty. Xiao Zhizhong's great-grandfather Xiao Deyan (蕭德言) served as the deputy head of the archival bureau during the Tang dynasty, and Xiao Zhizhong's grandfather Xiao Shen (蕭沈) and father Xiao Anjie (蕭安節) also served as officials, but in lesser positions.

In his youth, Xiao Zhizhong successively served as the sheriff of Yijue (伊闕) and Luoyang Counties—both parts of the Tang eastern capital Luoyang, which later served as the capital for Wu Zetian's Zhou dynasty. On one occasion, when he was set to meet a friend at an intersection, there was a sudden snowstorm, and the people around him all scattered to look for cover, but Xiao, believing that he needed to keep his word to the friend, stayed at the intersection until the friend appeared. At one point during Wu Zetian's reign, he was made Jiancha Yushi (監察御史), a low-level imperial censor, when he became known for daring to file an indictment against the chancellor Su Weidao, on charges that Su had illegally seized land from his neighbors, and Su was removed from his position. Xiao became well known for this indictment and began to develop a reputation for being willing to indict powerful people for crimes. On an occasion, when his superior, the chief imperial censor (御史大夫, Yushi Daifu) Li Chengjia (李承嘉), stated to the censors, "How can it be that you indict people without informing me?" None of the other censors dared to respond, but Xiao responded, "In the past, there was no supervisor among censors. The censors are supposed to serve as the ears and the eyes of the Son of Heaven, and what they submit should directly reach the emperor. If we have to receive approval from the chief imperial censor, then what would happen when the chief imperial censor is the one who is to be indicted?" Li turned away, embarrassed.

== During Emperor Zhongzong's second reign and Emperor Shang's reign ==
In 705, Wu Zetian was overthrown in a coup, and her son and crown prince Li Xian, a former emperor whom she had removed in 694, was restored (as Emperor Zhongzong). Emperor Zhongzong's cousin (Wu Zetian's nephew) Wu Sansi, who was also the lover of Emperor Zhongzong's wife Empress Wei, soon became exceedingly powerful, and Xiao Zhizhong became a member of Wu Sansi's party. On account of that, he was promoted to be Yushi Zhongcheng (御史中丞), the deputy chief imperial censor, and with Wu Sansi's support, he continued to be willing to indict powerful people, including Li Chengjia, Zhu Qinming, and Dou Xijie (竇希玠). He was soon given the additional responsibility as deputy minister of civil service affairs (吏部侍郎), and continued to serve as deputy chief imperial censor as well. Again with Wu Sansi's support, it was said that he selected officials without outside influence and refused all lobbying and bribes.

In 707, Emperor Zhongzong's son Li Chongjun the Crown Prince, born of a concubine, was angry at insults repeatedly thrown at him by his sister Li Guo'er the Princess Anle and her husband Wu Chongxun (武崇訓, Wu Sansi's son) and Li Guo'er's repeated attempts to become crown princess to displace him. He rose in rebellion and killed Wu Sansi and Wu Chongxun and then marched on to the palace, seeking to arrest Empress Wei, Li Guo'er, and another concubine of Emperor Zhongzong's, Consort Shangguan Wan'er, who also had an affair with Wu Sansi, but was soon defeated and killed in flight. In the aftermath of Li Chongjun's rebellion, there were investigations into anyone who might have conspired with Li Chongjun. The chancellors Zong Chuke and Ji Chuna, aligned with Empress Wei, had the censor Ran Zuyong (冉祖雍) accuse Emperor Zhongzong's brother Li Dan the Prince of Xiang and sister Princess Taiping of having conspired with Li Chongjun. Emperor Zhongzong requested Xiao to investigate, but Xiao, weeping, responded:

Your Imperial Majesty owns the world and is honored as the Son of Heaven, but how can you not protect even one brother and one sister from false accusations? This is a matter that goes to the survival of the dynasty. Even though I, your subject, am foolish, I still believe that this is not to be considered. The Book of Han stated, "One chi of cloth can be sewn. One dou of grain can be ground. But two brothers cannot tolerate each other." I wish that Your Imperial Majesty would carefully think about that passage. Further, in the past, everyone knew that Empress Zetian wanted to let the Prince of Xiang be crown prince, but the Prince went on a fast to beg for Your Imperial Majesty's return. His great faithfulness in yielding the position is known throughout the realm, and this shows that Ran's accusations are false.

Emperor Zhongzong accepted Xiao's words and took no further actions on the matter. Later in the year, he made Xiao Huangmen Shilang (黃門侍郎), the deputy head of the examination bureau (門下省, Menxia Sheng), and also gave Xiao the designation Tong Zhongshu Menxia Sanpin (同中書門下三品), making Xiao a de facto chancellor. At that time, powerful persons were often able not only to get their family members and friends made officials, but further be made officials near the capital Chang'an. Xiao submitted a petition asking Emperor Zhongzong to stop the practice and have the powerful people's family members and friends be sent out to the prefectures, so that people without powerful connections would have a chance to be promoted. Emperor Zhongzong did not accept his suggestion.

In 709, Xiao was made Shizhong (侍中), the head of the examination bureau and a post considered one for a chancellor and was also responsible for editing the imperial history. Later in the year, he was made Zhongshu Ling (中書令), the head of the legislative bureau (中書省), still a chancellor. At that time, Zong and Ji were organizing a faction in supporting Empress Wei, and other chancellors Wei Juyuan, Yang Zaisi, and Li Jiao went along with what this powerful faction wanted to do. Xiao alone did not do so and was much praised in popular opinion for this, and Emperor Zhongzong once commented, "Among the chancellors, Zhizhong cares about me the most." Nevertheless, Xiao gave his deceased daughter in a posthumous marriage to Empress Wei's deceased brother Wei Xun (韋洵), and also married a daughter to a son of Empress Wei's uncle Cui Congli (崔從禮). On the day of the wedding, Emperor Zhongzong presided on the Xiao side, and Empress Wei presided on the Cui side, leading to a popular comment, "The Son of Heaven is giving away a daughter, and the Empress is taking in a daughter-in-law." Sometime during Emperor Zhongzong's reign, Xiao was also created the Duke of Zan.

In 710, Emperor Zhongzong died suddenly—a death that traditional historians believed to be a poisoning by Empress Wei and Li Guo'er, so that Empress Wei could eventually become "emperor" like Wu Zetian, and Li Guo'er could become crown princess. Meanwhile, though, Emperor Zhongzong's son by another concubine, Li Chongmao the Prince of Wen, was named emperor (as Emperor Shang), but Empress Wei retained power as empress dowager and regent. Xiao remained chancellor. Less than a month later, Princess Taiping and Li Dan's son Li Longji the Prince of Linzi rose in rebellion, killing Empress Wei and Li Guo'er. Li Dan became regent over Emperor Shang. Xiao, upon hearing of Empress Wei's death, went to the tomb where his daughter and Wei Xun were jointly buried and dug out his daughter's casket. Still, he was considered a member of Empress Wei's party and was set to be punished, but Princess Taiping spoke on his behalf, and he was only demoted to be the prefect of Xu Prefecture (許州, roughly modern Xuchang, Henan).

== During Emperor Ruizong's second reign ==
Several days later, Li Dan took the throne himself (as Emperor Ruizong), and Emperor Shang was deposed and again took the title of Prince of Wen. Almost immediately, Xiao Zhizhong was recalled to again serve as Zhongshu Ling, but later in the year was again demoted to be a prefectural prefect, this time to Jin Prefecture (晉州, roughly modern Linfen, Shanxi). He was said to be an effective governor while serving there. It was said that when am emissary sent by the Eastern Tujue khan Ashina Mochuo went through Jin Prefecture while on the way to Chang'an and saw Xiao, he was surprised by Xiao's appearance and stated to another person, "He should be serving the Son of Heaven. Why is he here at a prefecture?" While at Jin Prefecture, Xiao sent messages to Princess Taiping—who by now was in a rivalry with Li Longji, whom Emperor Ruizong created crown prince—offering to join her faction, and Princess Taiping also believed that, because one of Xiao's sons died in the coup, he might be resentful and she might be able to use that to her advantage. In 712, at her recommendation, Xiao was recalled to serve as the minister of justice (刑部尚書, Xingbu Shangshu). It was said that his brother-in-law Jiang Qinxu (蔣欽緒) warned him that siding with Princess Taiping was dangerous, but he paid no heed to Jiang's warnings. On another occasion, when he came out of Princess Taiping's mansion, he happened to encounter Song Jing, who was at one point a censor serving under him, and Song semi-joked, "This is not what we expect of you, Professor Xiao." (Song referred to him as professor as he, as Song's supervisor, would have been one to instruct Song on proper procedures.) Xiao responded in the manner one would toward a student, "You, Mr. Song, speak capably." However, he did not take Song's warning either.

== During Emperor Xuanzong's reign ==
Later in 712, Emperor Ruizong passed the throne to Li Longji, who took the throne as Emperor Xuanzong, but Emperor Ruizong continued to wield actual power as Taishang Huang (retired emperor) at Princess Taiping's urging. Xiao Zhizhong was soon made the minister of civil service affairs (吏部尚書, Libu Shangshu), and in spring 713 was made Zhongshu Ling again, and again created the Duke of Zan. Soon thereafter, the work Xingzuxilu (姓族系錄), which compiled the family trees of prominent clans, edited by Xiao, Dou Huaizhen, Wei Zhigu, Cui Shi, Lu Xiangxian, Liu Cong (柳沖), Xu Jian (徐堅), and Liu Zixuan, was completed, and all of them were awarded with silk.

By 713, it was said that Princess Taiping, Dou, Cen Xi, Xiao, Cui; along with other officials Xue Ji, Li Jin (李晉) the Prince of Xinxing (a grandson of Li Deliang (李德良), a cousin of Tang's founder Emperor Gaozu), Li You (李猷), Jia Yingfu (賈膺福), Tang Jun (唐晙); the generals Chang Yuankai (常元楷), Li Ci (李慈), and Li Qin (李欽); and the monk Huifan (惠範), were plotting to overthrow Emperor Xuanzong. It was further said that they discussed, with the lady in waiting Lady Yuan to poison the gastrodia elata that Emperor Xuanzong routinely took as an aphrodisiac. When this alleged plot was reported to Emperor Xuanzong by Wei, Emperor Xuanzong, who had already received advice from Wang Ju (王琚), Zhang Shuo, and Cui Riyong to act first, did so. He convened a meeting with his brothers Li Fan (李範) the Prince of Qi, Li Ye (李業) the Prince of Xue, Guo Yuanzhen, along with a number of his associates—the general Wang Maozhong (王毛仲), the officials Jiang Jiao (姜皎) and Li Lingwen (李令問), his brother-in-law Wang Shouyi (王守一), the eunuch Gao Lishi, and the military officer Li Shoude (李守德)—and decided to act first. On July 29, Emperor Xuanzong had Wang Maozhong take 300 soldiers to the imperial guard camp to behead Chang and Li Ci. Then, Jia, Li You, Xiao, and Cen were arrested and executed as well.

It was said that Xiao was thrifty in his living style and free of corruption, but did little to give his wealth to others or to host guests, and therefore his salaries were saved. When he was executed, he had considerable properties that were confiscated.

== Notes and references ==
- Old Book of Tang, vol. 92.
- New Book of Tang, vol. 123.
- Zizhi Tongjian, vols. 207, 208, 209, 210.
