= Pei Tan (8th-century Tang chancellor) =

Pei Tan (裴談) was an official of the Chinese Tang dynasty, briefly serving as chancellor.

Despite Pei's high status, little is firmly established about his career except for the time that he served as chancellor—as, unusual for a chancellor, he did not have a biography in either the Old Book of Tang or the New Book of Tang. It is known that his clan traced its ancestry to the Cao Wei official Pei Hui (裴徽). Some of Pei Tan's ancestors served as officials for Jin dynasty (266–420), Former Qin, and Northern Wei, but Pei's several immediate ancestors did not carry any official titles.

As of 710, Pei was serving as minister of justice (刑部尚書) under Emperor Zhongzong, when Emperor Zhongzong died suddenly—a death that traditional historians believed to be a poisoning by Emperor Zhongzong's powerful wife Empress Wei and daughter Li Guo'er the Princess Anle. Empress Wei did not initially announce Emperor Zhongzong's death and quickly made a number of personnel moves in the government and the military. As a part of these moves, Pei was given the designation Tong Zhongshu Menxia Sanpin (同中書門下三品), making him a chancellor de facto. Soon, she had Emperor Zhongzong's son by a concubine, Li Chongmao the Prince of Wen, named emperor (as Emperor Shang), but retained power as empress dowager and regent. Less than a month later, Emperor Zhongzong's sister Princess Taiping and nephew Li Longji the Prince of Linzi, rose in rebellion and killed Empress Dowager Wei and Li Guo'er. LI Longji's father Li Dan the Prince of Xiang became emperor (as Emperor Ruizong), displacing Emperor Shang. Soon, as part of the major governmental reorganization, Pei was demoted to be the prefect of Pu Prefecture (蒲州, roughly modern Yuncheng, Shanxi). That was the last historical record about Pei, and it is not known when he died, although it is known that his son Pei Yuanming (裴元明) later served as a prefectural prefect as well. (There was a reference to Pei Tan in 714, when Pei Tan was listed among a list of secret police officials during the reign of Emperor Zhongzong's mother Wu Zetian in an edict by Li Longji (then reigning as Emperor Xuanzong), indicating that the former secret police officials should be removed from their posts and officially denounced, but it is not completely certain that this was the same Pei Tan.)

== Notes and references ==
- Zizhi Tongjian, vols. 209, 210.
