= Emperor Ruizong of Tang =

Emperor of Tang China (684–690, 710–712)

Emperor Ruizong of Tang 唐睿宗
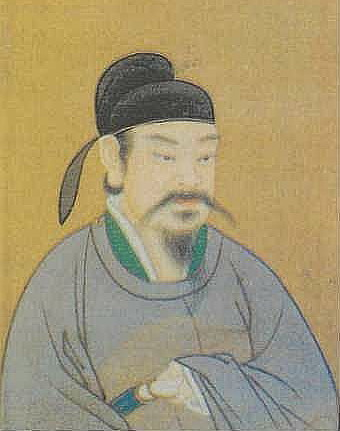

Emperor of the Tang dynasty
- Reign: 27 February 684 – 16 October 690
- Predecessor: Emperor Zhongzong (under Empress Zetian's regency)
- Successor: Dynasty abolished (Wu Zetian as empress regnant of the Wu Zhou dynasty)
- Regent: Empress Zetian
- Reign: 25 July 710 – 8 September 712
- Predecessor: Emperor Shang (Under Empress Wei's regency)
- Successor: Emperor Xuanzong
- Power behind the emperor: Princess Taiping
- Born: 22 June 662; Chang'an
- Died: 13 July 716 (aged 54); Baifu Hall, Chang'an
- Burial: Qiao Mausoleum (橋陵)
- Consorts: Empress Suming (died 693); Empress Zhaocheng (died 693)
- Issue Detail: Li Xian; Emperor Xuanzong
Names
- Family name: Lǐ (李), later Wǔ (武) (changed 690) later changed back to Lǐ (changed 705); Given name: Originally Xùlún (旭輪), later Lún (輪) (changed 669), later Dàn (旦) (changed 678), later Lún again (changed 690) later Dàn again (changed 698)
Era dates
- First reign: Wénmíng (文明) 684; Guāngzhái (光宅) 684; Chúigǒng (垂拱) 685–689; Yǒngchāng (永昌) 689; Zǎichū (載初) 690; Second reign: Jǐngyún (景雲) 710–712; Tàijí (太極) 712; Yánhé (延和) 712
Posthumous name
- Short: Emperor Shengzhen (聖真皇帝); Full: Emperor Xuanzhen Dasheng; Daxing Xiao (玄真大聖大興孝皇帝)
Temple name
- Rùizōng (睿宗)
- House: Li
- Dynasty: Tang
- Father: Emperor Gaozong
- Mother: Empress Zetian

Tang Ruizong
- Chinese: 唐睿宗
- Literal meaning: "Farsighted Ancestor of the Tang"
Transcriptions
Standard Mandarin
- Hanyu Pinyin: Táng Ruìzōng
Yue: Cantonese
- Yale Romanization: Tòhng Yeuihjūng

Li Dan
- Chinese: 李旦
- Literal meaning: (personal name)
Transcriptions
Standard Mandarin
- Hanyu Pinyin: Lǐ Dàn
Yue: Cantonese
- Yale Romanization: Léih Daan

Li Xulun
- Chinese: 李旭輪
- Literal meaning: (personal name)
Transcriptions
Standard Mandarin
- Hanyu Pinyin: Lǐ Xùlún
Yue: Cantonese
- Yale Romanization: Léih Yūklèuhn

Li Lun
- Chinese: 李輪
- Literal meaning: (personal name)
Transcriptions
Standard Mandarin
- Hanyu Pinyin: Lǐ Lún
Yue: Cantonese
- Yale Romanization: Léih Lèuhn

Wu Lun
- Chinese: 武輪
- Literal meaning: (personal name)
Transcriptions
Standard Mandarin
- Hanyu Pinyin: Wǔ Lún
Yue: Cantonese
- Yale Romanization: Móuh Lèuhn

Wu Dan
- Chinese: 武旦
- Literal meaning: (personal name)
Transcriptions
Standard Mandarin
- Hanyu Pinyin: Wǔ Dàn
Yue: Cantonese
- Yale Romanization: Móuh Daan

Emperor Ruizong of Tang (22 June 662 – 13 July 716), personal name Li Dan, also known at times during his life as Li Xulun, Li Lun, Wu Lun, and Wu Dan, was the fifth and eighth emperor of the Chinese Tang dynasty. He was the eighth son of Emperor Gaozong and the fourth son of Emperor Gaozong's second wife Empress Wu. He was wholly a figurehead during his first reign (684–690), when he was controlled by his mother. During his second reign after his mother's death, significant power and influence was exercised by his sister Princess Taiping.

In February 684, Li Dan's mother Empress Wu demoted his older brother Emperor Zhongzong (Li Xian) who had attempted to rule free of his mother and named him emperor (as Emperor Ruizong). Emperor Ruizong, however, was a hollow figurehead under control of his mother and had no real power, even nominally, his name was not included in the issued documents or orders. He was not even able to move freely around his private residence, let alone attend to governmental affairs. From then onwards, the Tang dynasty existed only in name and Empress Dowager Wu ruled China for over six years as quasi-emperor. Empress Wu, was comfortable about the empire being entirely under her control, decided finally to seize the throne, so in October 690 Emperor Ruizong ceded the imperial throne to his mother, who installed herself as empress regnant – the only woman in Chinese history ever to rule with this title. She issued a decree that ended the Tang dynasty and founded the Zhou dynasty. (Note: Decades earlier, in 653, a minor female agrarian rebel leader, Chen Shuozhen (陳碩真), had claimed the title of "Empress Regnant Wenjia" (文佳皇帝), during her rebellion. However, because her rebellion was very limited in scope and was quickly crushed, she is not typically regarded as a true "empress regnant." See Zizhi Tongjian, vol. 199. Earlier than that, during Northern Wei dynasty, Empress Dowager Hu, after her son Emperor Xiaoming's death, falsely declared Emperor Xiaoming's daughter to be a son and declared the daughter to be the new emperor, but almost immediately revealed that the child was in fact female, and thereafter declared Yuan Zhao, the young son of Emperor Xiaoming's cousin Yuan Baohui (元寶暉) emperor. See Zizhi Tongjian, vol. 152. Emperor Xiaoming's daughter is also therefore not usually considered a true emperor.) Emperor Ruizong was reduced to the position of crown prince, with the unconventional title of Huangsi (皇嗣, "imperial successor"). In the following years, Empress Wu's nephews Wu Chengsi and Wu Sansi tried to have one of them named heir to the throne, but Wu Zetian resisted these calls. Eventually, in October 698, faced with foreign invasion and dissatisfaction at home, Empress Wu accepted the suggestion of the chancellor Di Renjie and recalled the exiled Li Xian to the capital Luoyang. Soon, Li Dan offered to yield the position of crown prince to his elder brother, and Li Xian became crown prince instead.

In 705, a coup (Shenlong Coup) overthrew Wu Zetian and restored Emperor Zhongzong to the throne. The five years of Emperor Zhongzong's reign were dominated by Zhongzong's empress consort, Empress Wei. In the beginning of July 710, Emperor Zhongzong died, allegedly poisoned by Empress Wei who then named Zhongzong's youngest son Li Chongmao the Prince of Wen emperor (as Emperor Shang). A mere two weeks later, Li Dan's sister Princess Taiping and Li Dan's son Li Longji the Prince of Linzi launched a coup which resulted in the death of Empress Wei. Princess Taiping, Li Longji, and Li Longji's brother Li Chengqi the Prince of Song then persuaded Li Dan to take the throne himself, and he agreed, returning to the throne in Emperor Shang's stead. Li Longji, although not the oldest son, was made crown prince on account of his accomplishments.

Soon, however, tensions mounted between Princess Taiping, who had immense power, complete trust of the emperor and many supporters, and Li Longji (who was created crown prince). Li Longji constantly criticized his aunt for influencing his father's administration, which was in vain, instead Princess Taiping also responded to the proposal to remove him from the post of crown prince, which was in vain. Eventually, in September 712, Emperor Ruizong, believing that astrological signs called for a change of emperors, abdicated in favor of Li Longji (as Emperor Xuanzong). However, at Princess Taiping's suggestion, Emperor Ruizong, now carrying the title of Taishang Huang (retired emperor), continued to wield actual and superior power. This allowed Princess Taiping to continue to participate and have influence in governmental affairs without change and still had the power to stubbornly resist and bitterly fight against Li Longji (now Emperor Xuanzong). Eventually, in 713, suspecting Princess Taiping of planning a coup, Emperor Xuanzong acted first, killing her associates and forcing her to commit suicide. After the death of Princess Taiping, Emperor Ruizong himself yielded imperial powers to Emperor Xuanzong and left the governmental scene. He died in 716.

== Background ==
Li Xulun was born in 662, as the youngest son of Emperor Gaozong and his second wife Empress Wu (later known as Wu Zetian). Later that year, he was created the Prince of Yin. In 664, he was nominally made the commandant at Ji Prefecture (冀州, roughly modern Hengshui, Hebei) and the Chanyu Protectorate General (headquarters in modern Hohhot, Inner Mongolia). It was said that, as he grew, he became known for humility, the love for his siblings, and talent in calligraphy. In 666, his title was changed to Prince of Yu. In 669, his title was changed to Prince of Ji, and his name was changed from Xulun to Lun. In 675, his title was changed to Prince of Xiang. In 678, his title was changed back to Prince of Yu, and his name was further changed to Li Dan. He was also made the prefect of Luo Prefecture (洛州), the prefecture containing the eastern capital Luoyang. Sometime between 676 and 679, he married his wife Princess Liu.

Emperor Gaozong died in 683 and was succeeded by Li Dan's older brother Li Zhe the Crown Prince (as Emperor Zhongzong), but Empress Wu retained power as empress dowager and regent. Emperor Zhongzong was a figurehead, and Empress Dowager Wu was the solely in charge of the empire's affairs. In 684, when Emperor Zhongzong displayed signs of independence, she deposed him and replaced him with Li Dan (as Emperor Ruizong), but wielded power even more firmly. Indeed, she housed Emperor Ruizong in a different palace, She even forbade him to move around him personal residence and did not let him meet the imperial officials or give input on affairs of state, with Emperor Ruizong not even nominally approving official actions. Emperor Ruizong's wife Princess Liu was created empress, while her son Li Chengqi was created crown prince.

== First reign: under Empress Dowager Wu's regency and dethronement ==
Soon after Emperor Ruizong took the throne, Empress Dowager Wu carried out a major renaming of governmental offices and banners. She, who disliked the capital Chang'an, also elevated Luoyang's status, making it a co-equal capital with Chang'an. She further, at the suggestion of her nephew Wu Chengsi, built an ancestral temple for five generations of her ancestors and had Emperor Ruizong posthumously create them princes.

In fall 684, Li Jingye the Duke of Ying (the grandson of the deceased general Li Ji), started a rebellion against Empress Dowager Wu at Yang Prefecture, seeking the restoration of Emperor Zhongzong. Empress Dowager Wu, in response, sent the general Li Xiaoyi (李孝逸), assisted by the generals Li Zhishi (李知十) and Ma Jingchen (馬敬臣) to suppress Li Jianye's rebellion, and Li Xiaoyi quickly did so. Meanwhile, believing the chancellor Pei Yan to be undermining her authority, she executed Pei under accusation of treason and demoted a large number of officials and generals who dared to speak in Pei's defense, later executing some of them.

In 686, Empress Dowager created a number of bronze boxes designed to encourage secret reports of crimes. She also began to retain a group of secret police officials to carry out torture and interrogation of people suspected of opposing her rule, including Suo Yuanli, Zhou Xing, and Lai Junchen. On one occasion, she offered to return imperial authorities to Emperor Ruizong, but Emperor Ruizong knew that she was not actually intending to do so, and therefore declined. She thereafter resumed exercising imperial powers.

Emperor Ruizong had completely stayed out of political matters during these years, but he made an exception in 687 when Empress Dowager Wu believed the chancellor Liu Yizhi, who had previously served on his staff when he was a prince, whom she had trusted and promoted, to have turned against her in favoring that she return imperial authorities to Emperor Ruizong. She had Liu accused of corruption and arrested, and Emperor Ruizong personally wrote a petition to request her to spare Liu—which, however, as Liu observed, had the opposite effect, and she ordered Liu to commit suicide.

In 688, fearing that Empress Dowager Wu was using a ceremony to worship the god of the Luo River (洛水, flowing near Luoyang) as an excuse to summon them to Luoyang to slaughter them, the imperial princes considered rebellion, and one was launched by Emperor Ruizong's uncle Li Zhen the Prince of Yue and Li Zhen's son Li Chong the Prince of Langye, claiming that Emperor Ruizong was under arrest and needed to be rescued. However, both Li Zhen and Li Chong were quickly defeated; Li Chong was killed in battle, while Li Zhen committed suicide. Empress Dowager Wu used this opportunity to carry out a major purge of senior imperial Li clan members, including Emperor Ruizong's granduncles Li Yuanjia (李元嘉) the Prince of Han and Li Lingkui (李靈夔) the Prince of Lu.

In 690, Empress Dowager Wu received a number of petitions that she take the throne herself, and Emperor Ruizong also submitted such a petition. She accepted, and she took the throne as "empress regnant," establishing a new Zhou dynasty and interrupting Tang dynasty. She demoted Emperor Ruizong to the position of crown prince (with the unusual title Huangsi (皇嗣)), and changed his name back to Lun. She further had him take her family name of Wu.

== During Wu Zetian's reign ==
Despite the fact that Wu Zetian created Li Dan crown prince, she considered creating one of her nephews, Wu Chengsi the Prince of Wei or Wu Sansi the Prince of Liang crown prince, and a petition drive for Wu Chengsi to be created crown prince reached its peak in 691. The chancellors Cen Changqian and Ge Fuyuan were even executed for opposing it, but Wu Zetian never did carry out the change, and when the leader of the petition drive, Wang Qingzhi (王慶之) was caned to death by the official Li Zhaode, the petition drive dissipated.

Meanwhile, in 693, Wu Zetian's lady in waiting Wei Tuan'er (韋團兒), who was resentful of Li Dan for reasons lost to history, falsely accused Li Dan's wife Crown Princess Liu and concubine Consort Dou of witchcraft, and Wu Zetian killed Crown Princess Liu and Consort Dou. In fear of offending Wu Zetian, Li Dan did not dare to mourn either and continued to behave normally. When Wei Tuan'er tried to further falsely accuse Li Dan, someone, in turn, reported her activities to Wu Zetian, and Wu Zetian executed her. Still, thereafter, Li Dan's sons were demoted in rank and kept under secure watch. Later in 693, the officials Pei Feigong (裴匪躬) and Fan Yunxian (范雲仙) were executed on account of meeting Li Dan secretly, and there were accusations that Li Dan was planning to rebel against Wu Zetian. Wu Zetian ordered that the officials not be allowed to meet Li Dan, and further arrested his servants to interrogate them. The secret police official Lai Junchen tortured Li Dan's servants, and many of them, unable to stand up to the torture, considered falsely implicating Li Dan. One of them, An Jinzang, however, cut his own belly open and proclaimed Li Dan's innocence. When Wu Zetian heard this, she sent imperial doctors to save An, and, impressed by An's willingness to die to show Li Dan's innocence, ended the investigation against Li Dan.

In 698, after Wu Zetian had, at the encouragement of the chancellors Di Renjie, Wang Fangqing, and Wang Jishan, as well as her close associate Ji Xu and lovers Zhang Yizhi and Zhang Changzong, recalled Li Zhe from exile, Li Dan offered to yield the crown prince position to Li Zhe. Wu Zetian agreed and created Li Zhe crown prince (changing his name initially back to Li Xian and then Wu Xian) and Li Dan the Prince of Xiang.

In 699, Wu Zetian, in fear that after her death that Li Xian and the Wu clan princes would not be able to coexist peacefully, had Li Xian, Li Dan, their sister Princess Taiping, her husband Wu Youji (Wu Zetian's nephew), and the other Wu clan princes swear an oath to each other and read the oaths to the gods. The oaths were then carved on iron and kept in the imperial archives. Later that year, the restrictions on his and Li Xian's sons were lifted, and they were allowed to live outside the palace.

In 701, when there was an incursion by the Eastern Tujue khan Ashina Mochuo, Li Dan was put in command of an army to defend against the attack, but before the army could be launched, Ashina Mochuo withdrew. Subsequently, Li Dan was nominally put in charge of the imperial guards.

In 702, Wu Zetian put Li Dan in command of an army and made the prefect of Bing Prefecture (并州, roughly modern Taiyuan, Shanxi), with Wu Sansi, Wu Youning, and Wei Yuanzhong as his assistants, apparently preparing to attack Eastern Tujue, but the army was never launched. Later that year, she had Li Xian, Li Dan, and Princess Taiping submit formal petitions to have Zhang Changzong created a prince. She then formally rejected the petitions, but created Zhang Changzong and Zhang Yizhi dukes.

In 703, Li Dan was made the prefect of Yong Prefecture (雍州, roughly modern Xi'an, Shaanxi), the prefecture that included Chang'an.

== During Emperor Zhongzong's second reign under Empress Wei's shadow ==
In 705, Wu Zetian was overthrown in a coup led by Zhang Jianzhi, Cui Xuanwei, Huan Yanfan, Jing Hui, and Yuan Shuji. (Yuan was Li Dan's secretary general, and during the coup, Yuan's responsibility was to safeguard Li Dan, suggesting, but not proving, that Li Dan might have known about the coup plans.) Li Xian was restored to the throne, and he gave Li Dan the special title of Anguo Xiangwang (安國相王), literally "the Prince of Xiang who pacified the state." Emperor Zhongzong also gave Li Dan the title of Taiwei (太尉, one of the Three Excellencies) and made him a chancellor with the designation of Tong Zhongshu Menxia Sanpin (同中書門下三品). Li Dan declined both honors, and Emperor Zhongzong then offered to create him heir apparent, which Li Dan declined as well. Emperor Zhongzong subsequently created his son Li Chongjun crown prince.

In 707, Li Chongjun, who was not born of Emperor Zhongzong's powerful wife Empress Wei (her only son Li Chongrun having been killed by Wu Zetian), was angry that Empress Wei's daughter Li Guo'er the Princess Anle and her husband Wu Chongxun (武崇訓, Wu Sansi's son) repeatedly insulted him and were trying to persuade Emperor Zhongzong to create Li Guo'er crown princess to displace Li Chongjun, rose in rebellion and killed Wu Sansi and Wu Chongxun. His subsequent attack on the palace, however, was repelled, and he was killed in flight. Some of his followers implicated Li Dan and Princess Taiping after they were arrested and interrogated. Emperor Zhongzong initially had the imperial censor Xiao Zhizhong put in charge of investigating Li Dan and Princess Taiping, but at Xiao's earnest urging stopped the investigation.

In 708, when Li Guo'er married again, to Wu Yanxiu (武延秀), Li Dan was the ceremonial protector of her litter.

== During Emperor Shang's reign under Empress Dowager Wei's regency ==
On 3 July 710, Emperor Zhongzong died suddenly—a death that traditional historians believed to be a poisoning carried out by Empress Wei and Li Guo'er, so that Empress Wei could be Empress Regnant like Wu Zetian and Li Guo'er could be crown princess. Under a will drafted for Emperor Zhongzong by Princess Taiping and Emperor Zhongzong's concubine Consort Shangguan Wan'er, Emperor Zhongzong's son by another concubine, Li Chongmao would be named emperor, with Empress Wei serving as empress dowager and regent, but with Li Dan as co-regent. This plan, however, was opposed by and ultimately altered at the suggestions of Empress Wei's cousin Wei Wen and Zong Chuke. After Li Chongmao took the throne (as Emperor Shang), Empress Wei became empress dowager and regent, while Li Dan only received an entirely ceremonial title of senior advisor to the crown prince (太子太師, Taizi Taishi) – as there was no crown prince at the time.

Meanwhile, Empress Dowager Wei's party viewed Li Dan and Princess Taiping as threats and considered eliminating them. One of her partisans, Cui Riyong, was fearful of what would happen if the plan failed, and therefore informed the plan to Li Dan's son (by Consort Dou) Li Longji the Prince of Linzi. Li Longji responded by conspiring with Princess Taiping, Princess Taiping's son Xue Chongjian (薛崇簡), as well as several low-level officials close to him – Zhong Shaojing, Wang Chongye (王崇曄), Liu Youqiu, and Ma Sizong (麻嗣宗) – to act first. Meanwhile, Empress Wei's nephews Wei Bo (韋播) and Gao Song (高嵩), who had recently been put in command of imperial guards and who had tried to establish their authority by dealing with the guards harshly, had alienated the guards, and the guard officers Ge Fushun (葛福順), Chen Xuanli (陳玄禮), and Li Xianfu (李仙鳧) thereafter also joined the plot.

Without first informing Li Dan, the conspirators rose on 21 July, first killing Wei Bo, Gao, and Empress Wei's cousin Wei Gui (韋璿). They then attacked the palace. When Empress Dowager Wei panicked and fled to an imperial guard camp, a guard beheaded her. Li Guo'er, Wu Yanxiu, and the powerful lady in waiting Lady Helou were killed as well. Li Longji soon slaughtered a number of officials in Empress Dowager's faction as well as her clan, while displaying Empress Dowager Wei's body on the street. Li Dan took over as regent, but at the urging of Princess Taiping, Li Longji, and Li Chengqi, Li Dan soon took the throne from Emperor Shang and again became emperor. Emperor Shang was reduced in rank back to Prince of Wen.

== Second reign under Princess Taiping's shadow ==
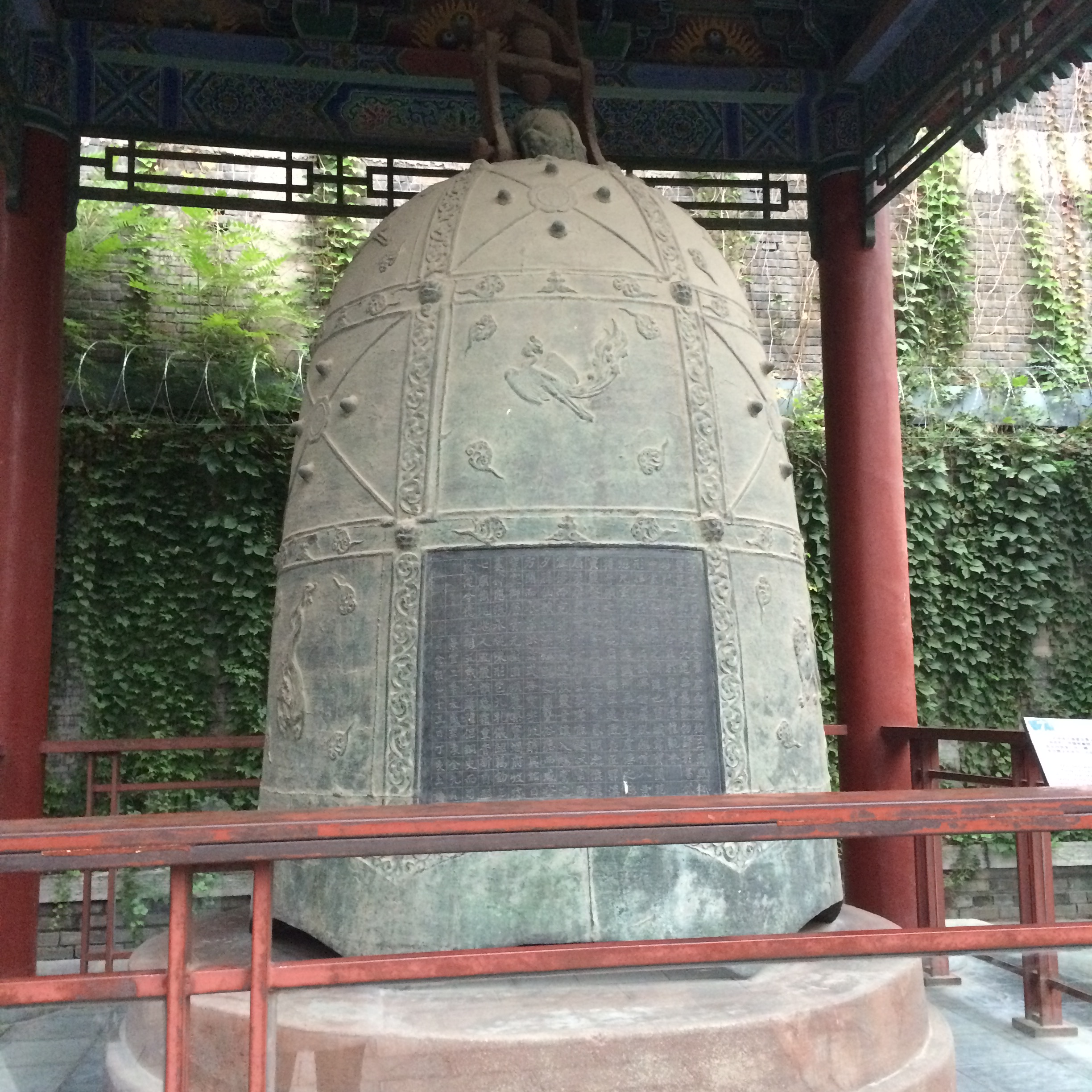
The Jingyun bell, cast in 711, weighing 6,500 kg, originally from the bell tower at the Tang dynasty capital Chang'an

Emperor Ruizong was immediately faced with the issue of whom to make crown prince—as Li Chengqi, as the oldest son overall and the oldest son of his wife, was the appropriate heir under Confucian principles of succession, but Li Longji had been the one whose accomplishments had allowed him to retake the throne. He hesitated. Li Chengqi declined consideration to be crown prince—stating to his father:

If the state were secure, then consideration should be first given to the oldest son of the wife. If the state were in danger, then consideration should be first given for achievement. If you did not follow this principle, the people of the entire empire will be disappointed. I would rather die than to be placed above the Prince of Ping [(i.e., Li Longji, whose title had been changed to Prince of Ping by this point)].

Li Chengqi wept and begged to yield for several days, and after further persuasion by the chancellor Liu Youqiu – who had been part of Li Longji's coup plans—Emperor Ruizong agreed and created Li Longji crown prince. Li Longji submitted a petition offering to yield to Li Chengqi, but Emperor Ruizong rejected it.

Emperor Ruizong reversed many of Emperor Zhongzong's actions and posthumously honored many people who lost their lives during the reigns of Wu Zetian and Emperor Zhongzong. He further removed thousands of officials that Emperor Zhongzong had commissioned at the recommendations of powerful courtiers, without having been submitted for examination by the examination (門下省, Menxia Sheng) and legislative (中書省, Zhongshu Sheng) bureaus of government, as was proper. Meanwhile, though, with Emperor Ruizong considered meek, the court was dominated by two competing factions—of Princess Taiping and Li Longji. Indeed, it was said that whenever chancellors brought proposals to Emperor Ruizong, Emperor Ruizong would ask them whether they had consulted Princess Taiping and Li Longji, and only act if the chancellors had consulted them. Emperor Ruizong especially trusted Princess Taiping and relied on her advice to run the governmental matters, and he could not ignore her requests, even if the request was to harm her enemy. Thus, Princess Taiping has decision-making power on many serious events in the court and the country matters. She can often decide the promotion or demotion of officials with a single sentence, so of the officials would rush to her to please her. As a result, her position and influence went beyond the emperor, and she ruled his administration from her own house without any restrictions. Among the relatives of the Tang dynasty and the ministers of civil and military affairs, there was still one person who made her feel terrified, and that was Li Longji. Princess Taiping, finding Li Longji to be not receptive to her influences and has a strong will, began to spread news of offenses by Li Longji, hoping that he would eventually be removed. In 711, the chancellors Yao Yuanzhi and Song Jing tried to defuse the situation by having Princess Taiping sent to Pu Prefecture (蒲州, roughly modern Yuncheng, Shanxi) and the two princes with arguable better claims on the throne than Li Longji—Li Chengqi and Li Shouli the Prince of Bin (whose father Li Xián (note different tone than Emperor Zhongzong) was an older brother to both Emperors Zhongzong and Ruizong) – out of the capital to serve as prefectural prefects, but after their plan was discovered by Princess Taiping, she angrily complained, and was recalled to the capital along with Li Chengqi and Li Shouli. Yao and Song, credited with reforming the civil service system, were demoted, and it was said that thereafter, the civil service system became as confused as it was during Emperor Zhongzong's reign.

In 712, the general Sun Quan (孫佺), the commandant at You Prefecture (幽州, roughly modern Beijing), aggressively attacked the Xi chieftain Li Dabu (李大酺), and was defeated by Li Dabu, at the loss of nearly the entire army.

Later in 712, Princess Taiping had astrologers warn Emperor Ruizong that the constellation that symbolized the imperial throne, Dizuo (帝座), showed that there would be a change in the emperor's position—believing that Emperor Ruizong would suspect Li Longji of plotting a coup and that she could remove Li Longji this way. Instead, Emperor Ruizong, reasoning that the change in the emperor's position could be accounted by an orderly transition, offered to pass the throne to Li Longji. Princess Taiping fervently opposed it, and Li Longji initially declined, but at Emperor Ruizong's insistence finally accepted and took the throne (as Emperor Xuanzong). However, at Princess Taiping's suggestion, Emperor Ruizong retained much of the imperial power as Taishang Huang (retired emperor): the appointment and removal of officials of the third rank and above (namely: chancellors) in the court, the reception of state guests, military control, the power of executions for the officials, the decision-making power of important military and political matters and power to official announcement, determine and reject the orders of the new emperor. As a result, his edicts continued to carry greater force than Emperor Xuanzong's; Even the new emperor had to obey his rulings.

== As retired emperor under Princess Taiping's shadow ==
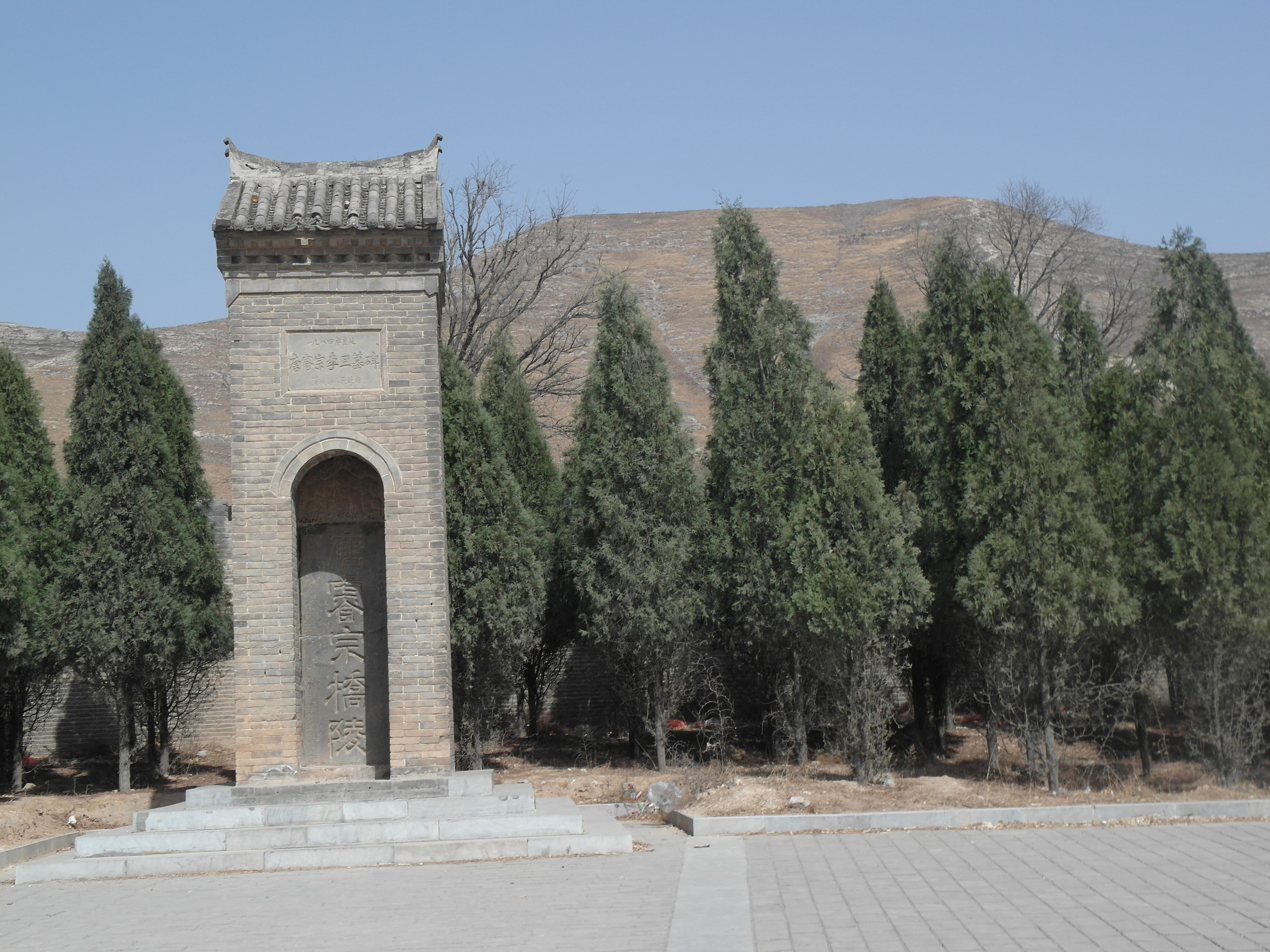
Qiaoling (橋陵), the tomb of Emperor Ruizong, in Pucheng County, Shaanxi

Meanwhile, Princess Taiping continued to be highly extremely influential in governmental matters through Emperor Ruizong: she used his power without permission, and most chancellors, forbidden troops, officials and warlords were her associates. (Of the seven chancellors at the time, five – Dou Huaizhen, Xiao Zhizhong, Cen Xi, Cui Shi, and Lu Xiangxian – were made chancellors at her recommendation, although Lu was not considered a member of her party.) As he continued to control, of course, he was still unable to control the rivalry scene dominated by two rival factions: the war between Princess Taiping and Emperor Xuanzong intensified: both sought to seize the full throne in their own right and sought to eliminate each other. Liu Youqiu and the general Zhang Wei (張暐), with Emperor Xuanzong's approval, planned to mobilize the imperial guards to kill several of those chancellors—Dou, Cui, and Cen. However, after Zhang told the plan to the imperial censor Deng Guangbin (鄧光賓), the news was leaked. Liu was arrested, and initially set to be executed. Emperor Xuanzong interceded on his behalf with Emperor Ruizong, and Liu, Zhang, and Deng were spared but exiled.

Later in 712, at the urging of Princess Taiping, Emperor Ruizong decreed that Emperor Xuanzong lead a group of soldiers to examine the northern border. She wanted to plot to replace him in his absence. However, the group of conscripted soldiers was disbanded in spring 713, and the plan was never carried out.

By summer 713, it was said that Princesses Taiping, Dou, Cen, Xiao, Cui; along with other officials Xue Ji, Li Jin (李晉) the Prince of Xinxing (a grandson of Li Deliang (李德良), a cousin of Tang's founder Emperor Gaozu), Li You (李猷), Jia Yingfu (賈膺福), Tang Jun (唐晙); the generals Chang Yuankai (常元楷), Li Ci (李慈), and Li Qin (李欽); and the monk Huifan, were plotting to overthrow Emperor Xuanzong. It was further said that they discussed, with the lady in waiting Lady Yuan to poison the gastrodia elata that Emperor Xuanzong routinely took as an aphrodisiac. When this alleged plot was reported to Emperor Xuanzong by Wei Zhigu, Emperor Xuanzong, who had already received advice from Wang Ju (王琚), Zhang Shuo, and Cui Riyong to act first, did so. He convened a meeting with his brothers Li Fan (李範) the Prince of Qi, Li Ye (李業) the Prince of Xue, Guo Yuanzhen, along with a number of his associates—the general Wang Maozhong (王毛仲), the officials Jiang Jiao (姜皎) and Li Lingwen (李令問), his brother-in-law Wang Shouyi (王守一), the eunuch Gao Lishi, and the military officer Li Shoude (李守德)—and decided to act first. On 29 July, Emperor Xuanzong had Wang Maozhong take 300 soldiers to the imperial guard camp to behead Chang and Li Ci. Then, Jia, Li You, Xiao, and Cen were arrested and executed as well. Dou fled into a canyon and committed suicide by hanging. Xue Ji was forced to commit suicide. When Emperor Ruizong heard about this, he quickly ascended the tower at Chengtian Gate (承天門) to ascertain what was happening. Guo reported to him Emperor Xuanzong's intentions, and Emperor Ruizong felt compelled to affirm Emperor Xuanzong's actions in an edict. The next day, Emperor Ruizong issued an edict transferring all authorities to Emperor Xuanzong and moved to a secondary palace, Baifu Hall (百福殿). Meanwhile, Princess Taiping, hearing what happened to her associates and the transfer of all authorities by Emperor Ruizong to Emperor Xuanzong, she found herself powerless and defenseless in a power struggle without the authority of her brother and without her allies, and fled into a temple in the mountains, only appearing three days later. Emperor Xuanzong ordered her to commit suicide at home, and put to death her sons and associates, except for Xue Chongjian. It was said that when Emperor Ruizong was at Baifu Hall, the only person who attended to him regularly was Emperor Xuanzong's daughter Princess Shouchun. With the death of Princess Taiping, her property, which is said to surround all of the most fertile land and the best livestock around the capital and in each province of the empire, and there were so many treasures of her that surpassed the total annual income of the empire, was confiscated by the treasury.

== Death ==
In 716, Emperor Ruizong died at Baifu Hall. He was enshrined into the imperial temple, along with Emperor Xuanzong's mother Consort Dou, who was posthumously honored an empress. Emperor Xuanzong had his daughter Princess Wan'an become a Taoist nun to seek blessings for Emperor Ruizong.

== Chancellors during reign ==
=== First reign ===
- Liu Rengui (684–685)
- Pei Yan (684)
- Guo Daiju (684)
- Cen Changqian (684–690)
- Wei Xuantong (684–689)
- Liu Jingxian (684)
- Wei Hongmin (684)
- Wang Dezhen (684–685)
- Liu Yizhi (684–687)
- Wu Chengsi (684, 685, 689–690)
- Li Jingchen (684)
- Qian Weidao (684–685, 688)
- Shen Junliang (684–685)
- Cui Cha (684–685)
- Wei Fangzhi (684–690)
- Wei Siqian (685–687)
- Pei Judao (685–690)
- Su Liangsi (685–690)
- Wei Daijia (685–689)
- Zhang Guangfu (687–689)
- Wang Benli (688–690)
- Fan Lübing (689–690)
- Xing Wenwei (689–690)
- Wu Youning (690)

=== Second reign ===
- Wei Anshi (710, 711)
- Tang Xiujing (710)
- Li Jiao (710)
- Su Gui (710)
- Zhang Renyuan (710)
- Zhang Xi (710)
- Pei Tan (710)
- Cen Xi (710, 712)
- Liu Youqiu (710–711, 711–712)
- Zhong Shaojing (710)
- Li Longji (710)
- Li Rizhi (710–711)
- Xue Ji (710)
- Yao Yuanzhi (710–711)
- Wei Sili (710)
- Xiao Zhizhong (710)
- Zhao Yanzhao (710)
- Cui Shi (710, 711–712)
- Cui Riyong (710)
- Song Jing (710–711)
- Li Chengqi (710) (Note: The office that Li Chengqi held, Shangshu Puye (尚書僕射), was ordinarily not considered an office for a chancellor by this point. However, the table of chancellors in the New Book of Tang listed Li Chengqi as a chancellor, albeit only briefly. See New Book of Tang, vol. 61.)
- Guo Yuanzhen (711)
- Zhang Shuo (711)
- Dou Huaizhen (711, 712)
- Lu Xiangxian (711–712)
- Wei Zhigu (711–712)

== Family ==
- Empress Suming, of the Liu clan of Pengcheng (肅明皇后 彭城劉氏/肃明皇后 彭城刘氏; d. 693)
  - Li Xian, Emperor Rang (讓皇帝 李憲／让皇帝 李宪; 679–742), first son
  - Princess Shouchang (壽昌公主／寿昌公主), first daughter
    - Married Cui Zhen of Boling (博陵 崔珍)
  - Princess Dai (代国公主; 689–734), personal name Hua (華/华), courtesy name Huawan (华婉), fourth daughter
    - Married Zheng Wanjun of Xingyang, Duke Xingyang (滎陽 鄭萬鈞／荥阳 荥阳公郑万钧) in 705, and had issue (two sons, four daughters)
- Empress Zhaocheng, of the Dou clan of Henan (昭成皇后 河南竇氏／河南窦氏; d. 693), second cousin
  - Li Longji, Xuanzong (玄宗 李隆基; 685–762), third son
  - Princess Jinxian (金仙公主; 689–732), eighth daughter
  - Princess Yuzhen (玉真公主; d. 762), personal name Chiying (持盈), ninth daughter
- Noble Consort, of the Cui clan of Qinghe (貴妃 清河崔氏/贵妃 清河崔氏; d. 691),
  - Li Fan, Crown Prince Huiwen (惠文皇太子 李范; 686–726), fourth son
  - Princess Xi (鄎国公主; 689–725), seventh daughter
    - Married Xue Jing of Hedong, Duke Fenyin (河東 薛儆／河东 汾阴公薛儆; 689–720), and had issue (four sons, five daughters)
    - Married Zheng Xiaoyi of Xingyang (滎陽 鄭孝義/荥阳 郑孝义) in 720
- Virtuous Consort, of the Wang clan of Taiyuan (德妃 太原王氏)
  - Li Ye, Crown Prince Huixuan (惠宣皇太子 李業/李业; 686–734), fifth son
  - Princess Huaiyang (淮陽公主/淮阳公主; 686–704), personal name Huashan (花山), third daughter
    - Married Wang Chengqing of Langya, Duke Linyi (瑯琊 王承慶／临沂公王承庆; d. 717) in 702, and had issue (one daughter)
  - Princess Liang (涼国公主; 687–724), personal name Nou (㝹), fifth daughter
    - Married Xue Boyang of Hedong, Duke Anyi (河東 薛伯陽/河东 薛伯阳; d. 713), a son of Xue Ji, and had issue (one son)
    - Married Wen Xi (溫曦/温曦) in 713, and had issue (one son)
- Noble Consort, of the Doulu clan (貴妃 豆盧氏／贵妃豆卢氏, 661 – 740)
- Able Consort, of the Wang clan of Taiyuan (賢妃/贤妃; 太原王氏), personal name Fangmei (芳媚)
- Lady, of the Liu clan of Hedong (宮人 河東柳氏／河东柳氏)
  - Li Hui, Crown Prince Huizhuang (惠莊皇太子 李㧑／惠庄皇太子 李㧑; d. 724), second son
- Unknown
  - Li Longti, Prince Sui (隋王 李隆悌; 692–702), sixth son
  - Princess Anxing Zhaohuai (安興昭懷公主／安兴昭怀公主; d. 692), second daughter
  - Princess Xue (薛国公主)
    - Married Wang Shouyi of Taiyuan, Duke Qi (太原 王守一; d. 723), and had issue (one daughter)
    - Married Pei Xun of Hedong, Duke Wei (河東 裴巽／河东 裴巽; 672–726) in 723 and had issue (one daughter)
  - Princess Huo (霍公主; d. 756)
    - Married Pei Xuji of Hedong (河東 裴虛己／河东 裴虚己)

== See also ==
- Chinese emperors family tree (middle)

== Notes ==
Emperor Ruizong of Tang House of Li Born: 22 June 622 Died: 13 July 716
Regnal titles
Preceded by Emperor Zhongzong of Tang	Emperor of the Tang dynasty 684–690 with Empress Dowager Wu	Succeeded by None (dynasty interrupted)
Preceded by Emperor Zhongzong of Tang	Emperor of China; Tang; 684–690	Succeeded by Wu Zetian
Preceded by Emperor Shang of Tang	Emperor of the Tang dynasty 710–712	Succeeded by Emperor Xuanzong of Tang
Honorary titles
Vacant Title last held by Wu Zetian	Retired Emperor of China; 712–716	Vacant Title next held by Emperor Xuanzong of Tang
