= Li Chengqi =

Prince of Ning 寧王
- Reign: 716–742

Prince of Song 宋王
- Reign: 710–716

Prince of Shouchun 壽春郡王
- Reign: 693–710

Crown Prince of the Tang dynasty
- Reign: 684–690
- Predecessor: Prince Yide
- Successor: Wu Dan

Prince of Yongping 永平郡王
- Born: 679
- Died: 5 January 742 (aged 63)
- Spouse: Lady Yuan; Lady Wei
- Issue: Li Jin, Prince of Ruyang
Names
- Li Chengqi (李成器) for most of his life, formerly Wu Chengqi (武成器), later Li Xian (李憲)
Posthumous name
- Emperor Rang (讓皇帝) "the emperor who yielded"
- House: Tang (唐)
- Father: Emperor Ruizong of Tang
- Mother: Empress Liu

Li Chengqi

Grand Commandant
- In office 733–741
- Preceded by: Li Dan
- Succeeded by: Li Chu

Minister over the Masses
- In office 713–713
- Preceded by: Wu Youji
- Succeeded by: Li Chengyi

Minister of Work
- In office 712–713
- Preceded by: Wu Sansi
- Succeeded by: Li Shouli

Li Chengqi (Chinese: 李成器) (679 – January 5, 742), known as Wu Chengqi (Chinese: 武成器) during the reign of his grandmother Wu Zetian and as Li Xian (Chinese: 李憲) after 716, posthumous name Emperor Rang (Chinese: 讓皇帝), was an imperial prince of the Tang dynasty who served as crown prince during the first reign of his father Emperor Ruizong, who yielded that position to his younger half-brother Li Longji (Emperor Xuanzong) during Emperor Ruizong's second reign. Li Chengqi had a number of children, including his oldest son, Li Jin, the Prince of Ruyang, who was called one of the Eight Immortals of the Wine Cup by famous poet Du Fu.

According to historical records, Li Chengqi was close to his younger brother, Li Longji (later Emperor Xuanzong), and was never ambitious. Despite his never having been emperor, he was posthumously honored as an emperor by Emperor Xuanzong.

== Background ==
Li Chengqi was born in 679, during the reign of his grandfather Emperor Gaozong. He was the oldest son of Li Dan, who was then the Prince of Yu, and Li Dan's wife Princess Liu. Sometime after his birth, he was created the Prince of Yongping.

== During Emperor Zhongzong's and Emperor Ruizong's first reigns ==
Emperor Gaozong died in 683 and was succeeded by Li Chengqi's uncle Li Zhe the Crown Prince (as Emperor Zhongzong), but actual power was in the hands of Li Chengqi's grandmother Empress Wu (later known as Wu Zetian), as empress dowager and regent. In 684, after Emperor Zhongzong showed signs of independence, she deposed him and replaced him with Li Chengqi's father Li Dan (as Emperor Ruizong), but thereafter held onto power even more firmly. After Emperor Ruizong's ascension, Li Chengqi was created crown prince on 20 February 684, and his mother Princess Liu was created empress on 27 February. In 688, when Empress Dowager Wu held a grand ceremony to offer sacrifices to the god of the Luo River (洛水, which flowed near the eastern capital Luoyang), she had Emperor Ruizong and Li Chengqi offer sacrifices after her. She also had them offer sacrifices after her when she, in 689, offered sacrifices to the god of heaven, the past emperors of Tang dynasty, her father Wu Shihuo (武士彠), and the gods of the five elements.

== During Wu Zetian's reign ==
In 690, Empress Dowager Wu had Emperor Ruizong yield the throne to her, establishing a new Zhou dynasty as Empress Regnant and interrupting Tang dynasty. Emperor Ruizong was reduced to crown prince, while Li Chengqi was reduced to the title of "imperial grandson" (皇孫). For a while, Li Chengqi and his younger brothers were allowed to establish residences outside the palace, and Li Chengqi was given a staff. As Wu Zetian changed Li Dan's surname to Wu, Li Chengqi also carried the surname of Wu during Wu Zetian's reign.

Things appeared to change in 693, however, after Li Chengqi's mother Crown Princess Liu and Li Dan's concubine Consort Dou were killed by Wu Zetian based on false accusations by the lady in waiting Wei Tuan'er (韋團兒). While Wu Zetian soon discovered that Wei Tuan'er's accusations were false (and executed her), Li Chengqi and his younger brothers were still reduced in their titles and were, along with their cousins Li Guangshun (李光順) the Prince of Yifeng, Li Shouli the Prince of Yong, and Li Shouyi (李守義) the Prince of Yong'an (the sons of their uncle Li Xian (note different character), whom Empress Dowager Wu had forced to commit suicide in 684), held under house arrest in the palace. (In Li Chengqi's case, his title was reduced to Prince of Shouchun.)

== During Emperor Zhongzong's second reign and Emperor Shang's reign ==
Wu Zetian was overthrown in 705 in a coup led by the officials Zhang Jianzhi, Cui Xuanwei, Jing Hui, Huan Yanfan, and Yuan Shuji. The former Emperor Zhongzong, whom Wu Zetian had recalled from exile in 698 and to whom Li Dan had subsequently yielded the position of heir apparent, was restored to the throne. He gave Li Chengqi's father Li Dan great honors and created Li Chengqi the greater title of Prince of Cai, but Li Chengqi declined this greater title and thereafter continued to be Prince of Shouchun.

Emperor Zhongzong died suddenly in 710—a death that traditional historians believed to be a murder carried out by his powerful wife Empress Wei and daughter Li Guo'er the Princess Anle. Empress Wei made Emperor Zhongzong's son by a concubine, Li Chongmao the Prince of Wen, emperor (as Emperor Shang), but took power as empress dowager, and as part of a number of honors that she conferred on various persons to try to pacify them, Li Chengqi was created the greater title of Prince of Song. Less than a month later, however, a coup led by Li Chengqi's aunt Princess Taiping and younger brother Li Longji the Prince of Linzi killed Empress Dowager Wei and Princess Anle. Princess Taiping subsequently ordered Emperor Shang to yield the throne to Li Dan, who initially declined, but under persuasion by Li Chengqi and Li Longji, accepted.

== During Emperor Ruizong's second reign ==
Emperor Ruizong was immediately faced with the issue of whom to make crown prince—as Li Chengqi, as the oldest son overall and the oldest son of his wife, was the appropriate heir under Confucian principles of succession, but Li Longji had been the one whose accomplishments had allowed him to retake the throne. He hesitated. Li Chengqi declined consideration to be crown prince—stating to his father: (Note: It is likely that Chengqi saw the similarity in the situations between him and Longji and between their great-granduncle Li Jiancheng and great-grandfather Emperor Taizong of Tang.)

If the state were secure, then consideration should be first given to the oldest son of the Empress. If the state were in danger, then consideration should be first given for achievement and ability. If you did not follow this principle, the people of the entire empire will be disappointed. I would rather die than to be placed above the Prince of Ping [(i.e., Li Longji, whose title had been changed to Prince of Ping by this point)].

Li Chengqi wept and begged to yield for several days, and after further persuasion by the chancellor Liu Youqiu—who had been part of Li Longji's coup plans—Emperor Ruizong agreed and created Li Longji crown prince. Li Longji submitted a petition offering to yield to Li Chengqi, but Emperor Ruizong rejected it. Li Chengqi was subsequently made a senior advisor to Li Longji, the prefect of the capital prefecture Yong Prefecture (雍州, roughly modern Xi'an, Shaanxi), and nominal commandant at Yang Prefecture (揚州, roughly modern Yangzhou, Jiangsu). Later that year, he was briefly made Shangshu Puye (尚書僕射) -- one of the heads of the executive bureau of government (尚書省, Shangshu Sheng), (Note: By this point, Shangshu Puye was ordinarily not considered a position for a chancellor any more. However, the table of chancellors in the New Book of Tang listed Li Chengqi as a chancellor. See New Book of Tang, vol.61.) before he was further given the honorific title Sikong (司空), one of the Three Excellencies.

Princess Taiping, who had already been powerful both in governance matters and in court conspiracies during Emperor Zhongzong's reign, and especially she became close to absolute power after Emperor Ruizong's return to the throne, had initially acquiesced to Li Longji's ascension as crown prince, believing that given his youth (25 at that time) he would be easy to control. However, she soon found him to be strong-willed and difficult to control, and she secretly considered finding some way to replace him with Li Chengqi or Li Shouli (who also could potentially have a legitimate claim for succession given that he was the senior son of Crown Prince Zhanghuai). In 711, under the suggestion of the chancellors Song Jing and Yao Yuanzhi, who supported Li Longji and wanted to eliminate doubt in people's minds about who would succeed Emperor Ruizong, Emperor Ruizong made Li Chengqi the prefect of Tong Prefecture (同州, roughly modern Weinan, Shaanxi) and Li Shouli the prefect of Bin Prefecture (豳州, roughly modern Xianyang, Shaanxi), while sending Princess Taiping and her husband Wu Youji the Duke of Chu to Pu Prefecture (蒲州, roughly modern Yuncheng, Shanxi). However, after Princess Taiping found out and objected, the plan was cancelled, and Song and Yao were demoted out of the capital Chang'an. Later in 711, Emperor Ruizong created a daughter of Li Chengqi the Princess Jinshan and offered to marry her to the khan of Eastern Tujue, Ashina Mochuo, or Ashina Mochuo's son Ashina Yangwozhi (阿史那楊我支) (although Princess Jinshan would ultimately not be married to either). Soon thereafter, Li Chengqi resigned the honorific title of Sikong and again served as Li Longji's advisor. In turn, Li Longji offered to yield the crown prince position to Li Chengqi, an offer that Emperor Ruizong again declined. In 712, Emperor Ruizong passed the throne to Li Longji, who took the throne as Emperor Xuanzong, although Emperor Ruizong continued to retain actual and superior power, as Taishang Huang (retired emperor).

== During Emperor Xuanzong's reign ==
Meanwhile, Princess Taiping continued to highly influential in governmental matters through Emperor Ruizong, and most chancellors, commanders of the imperial guards, officials and generals were her associates. Therefore, the survival of her power was an obvious dangerous threat and an undeniable challenge to Emperor Xuanzong's authority. In 713, Emperor Xuanzong, believing that Princess Taiping was about to, along with officials and generals loyal to her, start a coup to overthrow him, acted first, killing officials and generals close to her and then forcing her to commit suicide. Thereafter, Emperor Ruizong transferred full imperial authorities to Emperor Xuanzong, who subsequently conferred on Li Chengqi the honorific titles Kaifu Yitong Sansi (開府儀同三司) and Taiwei (太尉) (also one of the Three Excellencies). It was said that thereafter, Emperor Xuanzong tried to show his love toward his brothers—Li Chengqi, Li Chengyi (李成義) the Prince of Shen, Li Fan (李範) the Prince of Qi, Li Ye (李業) the Prince of Xue—as well as his cousin Li Shouli, who was raised with them, established rooms for them inside the palace to allow them to stay overnight whenever they wished. Emperor Xuanzong and the five princes often spent time together in various activities—discussing Confucian classics, writing poetry, drinking, gambling, gaming, hunting, and playing music (and Li Chengqi, in particular, was known for playing the di and jiegu). Li Chengqi was praised for being humble and careful, and Emperor Xuanzong was therefore respectful and trusting of him. Nevertheless, the officials were concerned that Li Chengqi, Li Shouli, and Li Chengyi (who was also older than Emperor Xuanzong) would become centers of conspiracies, and therefore requested that they be sent out of the capital to be prefects. In 714, Emperor Xuanzong agreed and sent the three princes out of the capital, and Li Chengqi became the prefect of Qi Prefecture (岐州, roughly modern Baoji, Shaanxi). He instructed them to only be concerned about the general policies of the prefectural governments, and to entrust the implementation to the secretaries general and the military advisors. Meanwhile, the princes offered the mansions that they (and Emperor Xuanzong) had previously lived in the Xingqing District (興慶坊) of Chang'an to be the location of a new palace for Emperor Xuanzong, and Emperor Xuanzong accepted and converted the mansions into Xingqing Palace (興慶宮). He built new mansions for the princes near the palace.

In 716, because Emperor Xuanzong's mother Consort Dou had been posthumously honored Empress Zhaocheng, Li Chengqi and Li Chengyi, in order to observe naming taboo, changed their names—Li Chengqi to Li Xian (note different character than his uncle) and Li Chengyi to Li Hui (李撝).

On 26 October 719, Li Xian's title was changed to Prince of Ning. Around that time, there was an incident in which Emperor Xuanzong, while on a skyway overseeing the palace, saw a guard who did not finish his meal but instead dumped some of the food in a hole. Angry that the guard was wasting food, he ordered that the guard be battered to death. None of Emperor Xuanzong's attendants dared to speak. However, Li Xian, who was present, calmly stated to Emperor Xuanzong:

Your Imperial Majesty had discovered this person's fault from a skyway. If you kill him, I am afraid that everyone will be fearful for himself. Moreover, the reason why Your Imperial Majesty despises wasting food is because food can be used to sustain life. Now, if you kill because of wasting food, the original point is lost.

Emperor Xuanzong agreed and stated, "If not for you, big brother, I would have killed excessively." He ordered the guard released. Later that day, at a feast, Emperor Xuanzong, in gladness, took off his belt, made of red jade, and awarded it to Li Xian, along with his own horse.

In 721, Li Xian became the minister of rites, a post that he served in until 726, when he again took on the honorific title Kaifu Yitong Sansi. In the 720s, he also helped to raise Li Qing, son of Emperor Xuanzong and his favorite consort, Consort Wu. Before Li Qing, Consort Wu had several children, but all died in infancy. As such, he was raised in Li Xian's household, and Li Xian's wife Lady Yuan became his milk mother.

On 18 May 733, he was again Taiwei. As the years went by, Emperor Xuanzong's brothers died one by one, with only Li Xian still remaining, and it was said that Emperor Xuanzong valued him even more. Whenever there were tributes submitted by the prefectures and the vassal states, he would always send some of the tributes to Li Xian.

Li Xian died near the new year 742. Emperor Xuanzong greatly mourned him, and, pointing out that Li Xian was initially the proper imperial heir, posthumously honored Li Xian as Emperor Rang and buried him with honors due an emperor. He also posthumously honored Li Xian's wife Princess Yuan as Empress Gong. It was then that Xuanzong changed the era name from Kai'yuan to Tian'bao. Li Xian's foster son Li Qing also requested Xuanzong that he be allowed to don mourning clothing; Xuanzong acceded to the request.

== Family ==
- Father
  - Emperor Ruizong of Tang
- Mother
  - Empress Suming, of the Liu clan of Pengcheng
- Issues and Descendents:
  - Li Jin, Prince of Ruyang (汝陽王 李璡), first son.
  - Li Sizhuang, Prince of Jiyang Commandery (濟陽郡王 李嗣莊), second son.
  - Li Lin, Prince of Ning (寧王 李琳), third son.
  - Li Xiang, Duke of Yingchuan Commandery (潁川郡公 李珦), fourth son.
  - Li Ting, Duke of Jinchang Commandery (晉昌郡公 李珽), fifth son.
  - Li Guǎn, Prince of Wei Commandery (魏郡公 李琯), sixth son.
  - Li Jie, Prince of Cangwu Commandery (蒼梧郡公 李玠), seventh son.
  - Li Guàn, Prince of Wen'an Commandery (文安郡公 李瓘), eighth son.
  - Li Yu, Prince of Hanzhong Commandery (漢中郡王 李瑀), ninth son.

== In fiction and popular culture ==
- Portrayed by Lo Chun-shun in The Legend of Lady Yang (2000).
- Portrayed by Eric Li in Deep in the Realm of Conscience (2018).
