= Empress Liu (Tang dynasty) =

Empress of China from 684 to 690

- Died: 8 January 693
- Issue: Li Chengqi; Princess Shouchang; Li Hua, Princess Dai
Posthumous name
- Empress Suming 肅明皇后
- Father: Liu Yanjing

Empress Liu (劉皇后, personal name unknown) (died 8 January 693), formally Empress Sumingshunsheng (肅明順聖皇后, literally "the solemn, understanding, serene, and holy empress") or Empress Suming (肅明皇后) in short, was an empress of the Chinese Tang dynasty. She was the wife of Emperor Ruizong.

== Background ==
It is not known when the future Empress Liu was born. Her grandfather Liu Dewei (劉德威; 582 - 652) had served as the minister of justice and her father Liu Yanjing (劉延景; died 25 November 689) as Prefect of Shǎn Prefecture. An aunt of hers (Liu Dewei's second daughter; 627 - 12 June 675) was married to Prince of Guo Li Feng, the 15th son of Emperor Gaozu of Tang. During the Emperor Gaozong's Yifeng era (676–679), Emperor Gaozong's son Li Dan, who was then an imperial prince, took her initially as a concubine, and then as his wife and princess. Emperor Gaozong of Tang said to Prince Huo, Li Yuan’gui: “The realm enjoys favorable weather and smooth military affairs; the sun, though due for an eclipse, remains whole. And my youngest son has long been the one I keep close in special affection. Recently, in selecting him a concubine, many candidates did not please me; but the daughter of Liu Yanjing, whom he has now taken, proves to be most filial. This is a private joy of mine. I wish to share this happiness with you, Uncle, so let us all drink our fill.” Such words bestowed the highest praise upon Lady Liu.They had three children—a son named Li Chengqi, and two daughters (the later Princesses Shouchang and Dai).

== As empress ==
As of 684, Emperor Gaozong had died and his son Li Zhe (Li Dan's older brother) had become emperor (as Emperor Zhongzong). In spring 684, Emperor Zhongzong showed signs of independence from his (and Li Dan's) mother Empress Dowager Wu (later known as Wu Zetian), who wielded most of the imperial power, and she deposed Emperor Zhongzong, replacing him with Li Dan (as Emperor Ruizong), but held power even more securely after that point. As Emperor Ruizong's wife, Princess Liu was created empress on 27 February 684, and her son Li Chengqi was created crown prince earlier, on 20 February 684.

In 690, Empress Dowager Wu forced Emperor Ruizong to yield the throne to her, and she took the throne as "emperor" of a new Zhou dynasty, interrupting the Tang dynasty. She created Li Dan crown prince instead (with the unconventional title Huangsi (皇嗣)), and further changed his name to Wu Dan. Empress Liu became crown princess.

== Death ==
In January 693, one of Wu Zetian's trusted ladies in waiting, Wei Tuan'er (韋團兒), was, for reasons lost to history, said to be resentful of Wu Dan. To attack him, she decided to first falsely accuse Crown Princess Liu and one of Wu Dan's concubines, Consort Dou, of witchcraft. On an occasion when both Crown Princess Liu and Consort Dou were in the palace to greet Wu Zetian, Wu Zetian waited until they left her presence, and then sent assassins to kill them. Their bodies were buried inside the palace, and the location was kept secret. Wu Dan, fearful of what his mother might do next, said nothing of the loss of his wife and concubine. When Wei Tuan'er considered further falsely accusing Wu Dan, her plans were leaked to Wu Zetian, and Wu Zetian executed her.

In 710, Wu Dan (whose name had been restored to Li Dan by that point after Tang dynasty's restoration in 705 under Emperor Zhongzong, who was restored that year) became emperor after Emperor Zhongzong's death. He honored Empress Liu as Empress Suming and Consort Dou (whose son Li Longji (the later Emperor Xuanzong) had been made the Prince of Shouchun) as Empress Zhaocheng, and he sought to locate their bodies for reburial, but could not locate them. He therefore carried out ceremonies where their spirits were summoned to caskets to be buried at an imperial tomb. After Emperor Ruizong's own death in 716, on account of Emperor Xuanzong's desire to honor his mother Consort Dou, Empress Liu was initially not worshipped together with Emperor Ruizong at the imperial ancestral temple, but eventually was, on 26 January 733.

Chinese royalty
Preceded by Empress Wei	Empress of the Tang dynasty 684–690	Succeeded by None (dynasty interrupted); next empress was the restored Empress Wei
