= Li Linfu =

Tang dynasty chancellor

Duke of Jin (晉公) Li Linfu
- 李林甫

Left Supervisor of the Department of State Affairs (左尚書僕射)
- In office 742–752
- Monarch: Emperor Xuanzong

Secretariat Director (中書令)
- In office 736–752
- Monarch: Emperor Xuanzong

Minister of Rites (禮部尚書)
- In office 734–736
- Monarch: Emperor Xuanzong

Personal details
- Born: 683
- Died: January 3, 753 (aged 69–70)
- Parents: Jiang Jiao (mother); Li Sihui (father)

Li Linfu (Chinese: 李林甫; 683 – 3 January 753), milk name Genu (哥奴), art name Yuetang (月堂), was a Chinese historian, musician, and politician of the Tang dynasty, serving as a chancellor for 18 years (734–752), during the reign of Emperor Xuanzong. His tenure as chancellor was one of the longest in Tang history, and the longest during Emperor Xuanzong's reign.

Li was known for his flattery of the Emperor and skill in the political scene, which enabled him to remain powerful throughout his lengthy duration as chancellor. His treachery in cutting off all routes for all potential political challengers, including false accusations against other officials and the granting of key military commands to non-Han commanders, were blamed for the deterioration of Emperor Xuanzong's reign, which culminated in the An–Shi Rebellion after Li Linfu's death. Emperor Xuanzong himself admitted after the An–Shi Rebellion broke out (when Li had died) that Li was most adept at removing political rivals and being jealous of any potential challengers, a factor which resulted in the Tang administration lacking seriously competent officials during the Tianbao era.

== Background ==
It is not known when Li Linfu was born. He was a great-grandson of Li Shuliang (李叔良) the Prince of Changping, who was a cousin of Tang dynasty's founder Emperor Gaozu. Li Linfu's grandfather Li Xiaobin (李孝斌) carried the title of Duke of Huayang and served as a prefectural secretary general. Li Linfu's father Li Sihui (李思誨) served as a military officer at Yang Prefecture (揚州, roughly modern Yangzhou, Jiangsu). Li Linfu's mother was a sister of the official Jiang Jiao (姜皎), a close associate of Emperor Gaozu's great-great-grandson Emperor Xuanzong who became prominent during Emperor Xuanzong's reign, carrying the title of Duke of Chu. Li Linfu studied music and was favored by his uncle Jiang.

== During Emperor Xuanzong's reign ==
=== Before chancellorship ===
During Emperor Xuanzong's reign, when Yuan Qianyao served as a chancellor, Li Linfu was a member of the staff of Emperor Xuanzong's crown prince Li Siqian. Yuan had been recommended by Jiang Jiao at the start of his career and had had his grandnephew Yuan Guangcheng (元光乘) marry Jiang's sister. Because of these relations, Yuan's son Yuan Jie (源絜) relayed a plea from Li Linfu to be made Simen Langzhong (司門郎中), a low level official at the ministry of justice. Yuan Qianyao, however, did not view Li Linfu highly, and commented, using Li Linfu's nickname, "People who are to serve as Lang must have good talent and virtues. Genu is no Lang." Several days later, however, he had Li Linfu promoted among the ranks of Li Siqian's staff members. Li Linfu later served as Guozi Siye (國子司業), the deputy principal of the imperial university.

In 726, the official Yuwen Rong became deputy chief imperial censor (御史中丞, Yushi Zhongcheng). Yuwen was friendly with Li Linfu, and therefore recommended Li Linfu to serve as a colleague; Li Linfu was thus made a deputy chief imperial censor as well, and later successively served as deputy ministers of justice (刑部侍郎, Xingbu Shilang) and civil service affairs (吏部侍郎, Libu Shilang). At that time, Emperor Xuanzong's favorite concubine Consort Wu dominated the palace, and her sons Li Mao (李瑁) the Prince of Shou and Li Qi (李琦) the Prince of Sheng were Emperor Xuanzong's favorite sons, diverting favor away from Li Siqian (whose name had been changed to Li Ying, by that point). Li Linfu was friendly with many important eunuchs, and through them informed Consort Wu that he was willing to support Li Mao to try to supplant Li Ying. Meanwhile, Li Linfu had also been having an affair with the wife of the chancellor Pei Guangting, who was a daughter of Wu Sansi, a deceased nephew of Emperor Xuanzong's grandmother Wu Zetian and a relative of Consort Wu. After Pei died in 733, Lady Wu requested that the powerful eunuch Gao Lishi, who had served Wu Sansi at one point, to recommend Li Linfu to replace Pei. Gao did not dare to make the recommendation, but when Emperor Xuanzong was set to name Han Xiu chancellor, Gao leaked this information to Lady Wu first, who then told Li Linfu. Li Linfu submitted a petition endorsing Han, who became grateful. When Han subsequently had conflicts with fellow chancellor Xiao Song, he recommended Li Linfu to serve as chancellor, and Consort Wu was also speaking on Li Linfu's behalf. Emperor Xuanzong did not make him chancellor immediately, but made him Huangmen Shilang (黃門侍郎), the deputy head of the examination bureau of government (門下省, Menxia Sheng) and favored him more.

=== As chancellor ===
In 734, Li Linfu was made the minister of rites (禮部尚書, Libu Shangshu) and was further given the designation Tong Zhongshu Menxia Sanpin (同中書門下三品), making him a chancellor de facto, serving alongside Pei Yaoqing and Zhang Jiuling. By 736, he, who gained further favor from Emperor Xuanzong by flattering the emperor, was in serious conflict with the blunt Zhang, over a number of matters:

- In fall 736, when Emperor Xuanzong was at Luoyang, he had set to return to Chang'an on March 7, 737. However, at that time, an incident occurred where there were strange apparitions appearing in the Luoyang Palace, and Emperor Xuanzong did not want to stay at Luoyang. On or right before November 9, 736, he summoned the chancellors to ask them whether he could depart for Chang'an immediately. Pei and Zhang, pointing out the fact that it was harvest season and that the imperial train would interfere with harvest, requested a one-month delay. After Pei and Zhang exited, however, Li Linfu remained personally and stated his agreement with the departure, arguing that the farmers could be compensated by relieving their taxes. Emperor Xuanzong was pleased and immediately departed for Chang'an.
- Emperor Xuanzong was, then, impressed with Niu Xianke, the military governor (节度使, jiedushi) of Shuofang Circuit (朔方, headquartered in modern Yinchuan, Ningxia), wanted to make him the minister of defense. Zhang, who pointed out that Niu was not well-learned and had started from the ranks of low-level administrators—contrary to the Tang tradition of going through the imperial examinations—opposed, and then further opposed the creation of a title. Eventually, despite Zhang's opposition, Emperor Xuanzong, with concurrence from Li Linfu, created Niu the Duke of Longxi.
- Li Linfu was trying to have Emperor Xuanzong make Li Mao crown prince to replace Emperor Xuanzong's Li Ying, who had long lost Emperor Xuanzong's favor and who had offended Emperor Xuanzong and Consort Wu over an incident where he and his brothers Li Yao (李瑤) the Prince of E and Li Ju (李琚) the Prince of Guang privately complained about how Emperor Xuanzong had lost favor for their mothers. With Zhang strenuously opposing such a move, Li Ying remained in his position.
- The deputy minister Xiao Jiong (蕭炅), whom Li Linfu recommended, was demoted on the suggestion of Zhang and Zhang's friend Yan Tingzhi (嚴挺之), who further offended Li Linfu by refusing to meet with him. Soon thereafter, there was an incident where Wang Yunyan (王元琰), the husband of Yan's ex-wife, was accused of corruption. Yan tried to intercede on Wang's behalf, and this was discovered.

Li Linfu thus made accusations to Emperor Xuanzong that Zhang and Pei were engaging in factionalism. Around the new year 737, Emperor Xuanzong removed Pei and Zhang from their chancellor posts, making them Chengxiang (丞相)—the heads of the executive bureau of government (尚書省, Shangshu Sheng) instead, posts not considered chancellor posts. Niu was made chancellor to replace them, serving with Li Linfu, who was given the office formerly held by Zhang, Zhongshu Ling (中書令), the head of the legislative bureau (中書省, Zhongshu Sheng). This was often viewed by traditional historians as the turning point of Emperor Xuanzong's reign, which up to that point was considered a golden age in Chinese history, toward a path of degeneration. The Song dynasty historian Sima Guang, in his Zizhi Tongjian, for example, commented:

Of the chancellors that the Emperor commissioned after he took the throne, Yao Chong emphasized flexibility, Song Jing emphasized the rule of law, Zhang Jiazhen emphasized administrative abilities, Zhang Shuo emphasized literary talent, Li Yuanhong and Du Xian emphasized frugality, and Han Xiu and Zhang Jiuling emphasized honesty. All of them had their different talents. After Zhang Jiuling was demoted, however, the officials were all concerned about keeping their positions, and honest words no longer had a place in government.

It was said that because Niu was recommended by Li Linfu, he followed Li Linfu's directions, while Li Linfu discouraged dissent within the government—telling junior officials that they, like imperial horses who would not obey directions, were easily replaceable. When the official Du Jin (杜璡) nevertheless submitted a proposal, Du was immediately sent out of a capital—ostensibly for a promotion, but considered demoted due to his new post's being away. It was further said that Li Linfu held his emotions in check and was difficult to discern; he often used sweet words to please others and then attack them when they were not ready. He endeared those who were close to the emperor, while finding ways to eliminate potential competitors for power. The Chinese proverb "having honey in the mouth and a sword in the belly" (口蜜腹劍, kou mi fu jian), first became idiomatic when used to describe him.

In 737, after the imperial censor Zhou Ziliang (周子諒) angered Emperor Xuanzong by filing an indictment against Niu and was caned and then exiled, Li Linfu took the opportunity to point out that Zhang had recommended Zhou. As a result, Zhang was demoted out of the capital to serve as a prefectural secretary general.

Also in 737, Consort Wu decided to try to trick Li Ying, Li Yao, and Li Ju. She had a message sent to the three princes, stating, "There are bandits in the palace. Please report at once in armor!" The three princes arrived in full armor, and she thereafter told Emperor Xuanzong, "The three princes are planning treason. Look, they have come in full armor." Emperor Xuanzong had his eunuchs check out the situation, and the three princes were seen in full armor. Yang Hui subsequently accused Li Ying, Li Yao, and Li Ju of treason. When Emperor Xuanzong discussed this with the chancellors, Li Linfu stated, "This is Your Imperial Majesty's family matter. We will not interfere." The three princes were soon reduced to commoner rank and forced to commit suicide. Meanwhile, the deputy chief judge of the supreme court, Xu Jiao (徐嶠) submitted a flattering report to Emperor Xuanzong, pointing out that there were only 58 death sentences handed down for the year and that the reduced number of sentences showed that Emperor Xuanzong's reign was so peaceful that they were not required. Emperor Xuanzong, in turn, credited the chancellors, and created Li Linfu the Duke of Jin and Niu the Duke of Bin. It was also around this time that a revision of the laws, led by Li Linfu, Niu, and the officials in charge of the justice system, was completed.

In 738, Li Linfu was made the deputy military governor of Longyou Circuit (隴右, headquartered in Haidong Prefecture, Qinghai), but did not report to Longyou and remained in the capital as chancellor. He was soon also made the military governor of Hexi Circuit (河西, headquartered in Wuwei, Gansu). Meanwhile, he was repeatedly urging Emperor Xuanzong to create Li Mao crown prince, but Emperor Xuanzong hesitated—with Consort Wu having died in 737. Instead, at Gao's urging, Emperor Xuanzong created an older son, Li Yu the Prince of Zhong crown prince instead.

In 739, Li Linfu was given the additional title as minister of civil service affairs (吏部尚書, Libu Shangshu, note different character than minister of rites) and was put in charge of selecting civilian officials, while Niu was given the additional title as minister of defense and put in charge of selecting military officers. Meanwhile, when the eunuch Niu Xiantong (牛仙童, unrelated to Niu Xianke) was found to have accepted bribes, Li Linfu used this opportunity to accuse Xiao Song, now retired but still influential, of bribing Niu Xiantong, and Xiao was demoted out of the capital.

Meanwhile, Li Linfu was said to be constantly bribing the eunuchs and ladies in waiting himself to keep an eye on Emperor Xuanzong's emotions and acts, to allow him to carry out actions that would help him stay in power. For example, when Emperor Xuanzong was impressed by the official Lu Xuan (盧絢) on one occasion and appeared poised to promote him, Li Linfu, viewing Lu as a potential threat, summoned Lu's younger clan members and informed them that Emperor Xuanzong was set to make Lu the commandant of distant Jiao Prefecture (交州, roughly modern Hanoi, Vietnam) or Guang Prefecture (廣州, roughly modern Guangzhou, Guangdong)—technically promotion, but considered at that point to be positions of exile—causing Lu to, in fear, submit a resignation, asking to be made a member of the staff of Li Yu (whose name was changed to Li Heng by that point). Lu Xuan was ultimately made a member of Li Heng's staff, out of contention for the chancellorship. Meanwhile, when Emperor Xuanzong appeared poised to recall Yan Tingzhi, perhaps to make him chancellor, Li Linfu tricked Yan's brother Yan Sunzhi (嚴損之) into believing that the best way to have Yan Tingzhi recalled was to claim that Yan Tingzhi was ill. Li Linfu then managed to have Emperor Xuanzong make Yan Tingzhi a member of Li Heng's staff as well, along with Qi Huan (齊澣), another influential senior official that Li Linfu viewed as a threat.

With Li Linfu serving as chancellor, he entrusted the official selection process to the deputy ministers of civil service affairs Song Yao (宋遙) and Miao Jinqing. In 743, a scandal involving the imperial examination process thus developed, with Song and Miao wanting to ingratiate the official Zhang Yi (張倚), who was then favored by Emperor Xuanzong, by allowing Zhang Yi's son Zhang Shi (張奭) to pass the imperial examinations. When the results were announced, they were largely viewed as unfair. The military governor An Lushan reported this to Emperor Xuanzong, and Emperor Xuanzong personally retested the 64 persons who passed the examination. Zhang Shi was unable to even write anything in response to Emperor Xuanzong's question. As a result, Song, Miao, and Zhang Yi were all demoted, but Li Linfu did not suffer any consequences.

By this point, Li Linfu was said to be so powerful that officials needed his recommendations for promotion, and that those who were commissioned without such recommendations would soon fall prey to his false accusations. For example, in 743, when the official Yang Shenjin (楊慎矜) was set to be promoted to be deputy chief imperial censor, he did not dare to accept the position because Li Linfu did not recommend him, accepting the office only in 744 when he received a recommendation from Li Linfu. Also, Li Linfu, viewing the official Pei Kuan (裴寬) as a potential threat to be chancellor as well, induced the general Pei Dunfu (裴敦復) into accusing Pei Kuan of nepotism, and Pei Kuan was demoted. (Li Linfu, however, also viewed Pei Dunfu as a threat, and soon had him sent out of the capital.) Meanwhile, Emperor Xuanzong, who was very trusting of Li Linfu at this point, considered formally letting Li LInfu take over all matters of state. Gao spoke against it, pointing out then that no one would be able to control the chancellor. Emperor Xuanzong was displeased with Gao's response, but did not formally bestow Li Linfu with such authorities.

By 745, Li Linfu was further using judges, the chief among whom were Ji Wen (吉溫) and Luo Xishi (羅希奭), who were known for using torture to extract confessions, in order to accuse his political enemies of crimes. For example, in 745, wanting to attack fellow chancellor Li Shizhi, who was then also minister of defense, and the official Zhang Ji (張垍), who was deputy minister of defense and a son-in-law to Emperor Xuanzong, he had some 60 officials under them accused of corruption. Under torture by Ji Wen, these officials all admitted corruption, although Emperor Xuanzong took no actions against Li Shizhi or Zhang Ji at this point.

Meanwhile, Li Shizhi and another official with designs on the chancellorship—Wei Jian (韋堅), who was Li Heng's brother-in-law, as well as Li Linfu's uncle Jiang Jiao's son-in-law and thus who had initially gained favor with Li Linfu—were associating with each other, and Li LInfu viewed both as threats. He had Wei ostensibly promoted but removed Wei from a number of finance-related positions that he had held and at which he had gained Emperor Xuanzong's favors by adding to the imperial treasury income. In 746, he then tricked Li Shizhi into making a suggestion to Emperor Xuanzong of opening gold mines at Mount Hua—and then himself informed Emperor Xuanzong that, based on Taoist principles, he believed that a mine at Mount Hua would damage Emperor Xuanzong's health, thus bringing imperial displeasure on Li Shizhi. He then accused Wei and a general close to Li Heng, Huangfu Weiming (皇甫惟明), of inappropriate close association and intimated that they were ingratiating Li Heng. (Li Linfu had been apprehensive about Li Heng's elevation against his recommendation of Li Mao, and therefore sought to undermine Li Heng by making this accusation as well.) Wei and Huangfu were thus demoted to be commandery governors. Li Shizhi, in fear, offered to resign his chancellorship. Emperor Xuanzong made Li Shizhi an advisor to Li Heng and removed him from his chancellor position. Li Linfu, believing that the official Chen Xilie, who became favored by Emperor Xuanzong because of Chen's dabbling in supernatural matters, would be easy to control, and therefore recommended Chen to succeed Li Shizhi. After Chen became chancellor, however, effectively, all matters were still decided by Li Linfu, leaving Chen with no real authorities.

Late in 746, when Wei Jian's brothers Wei Lan (韋蘭) and Wei Zhi (韋芝) submitted a petition to try to defend their brother, the petition backfired badly, as their citation of what Li Heng had spoken caused Emperor Xuanzong to indeed believe that they were loyal to Li Heng and not to him. Li Heng, in fear, divorced Crown Princess Wei, and subsequently, Wei Jian and his brothers were exiled, and Li Linfu took this opportunity to several other officials associated with the Weis—Li Shizhi, Wei Bin (韋斌), Li Xuan (李琄) the Prince of Xue (a nephew to both Emperor Xuanzong and Wei Jian), Pei Kuan, and Li Qiwu (李齊物)—all demoted to remote posts. When, shortly after, Du Youlin (杜有隣) the father of Li Heng's concubine Consort Du, as well as Du Youlin's son-in-law Liu Ji (柳勣) were accused of criticizing Emperor Xuanzong, Li Linfu took the opportunity to have Ji Wen extend the target, eventually convincing Emperor Xuanzong that Li Yong (李邕), Pei Dunfu, Huangfu, and the Wei brothers were all involved in the plot and had them all killed at their posts or in exile. A number of others, including Li Shizhi and Wang Ju (王琚), were terrorized into committing suicide. Li Heng, however, avoided consequences, as Emperor Xuanzong believed him to be filially pious. After Wei Jian's death, Li Linfu was still angry at Wei Jian, and had the judges continue to pursue people accused of being Wei Jian's associates and torture them, until Li LInfu's later death in 752.

In 747, Emperor Xuanzong wanted to expand the government's talent pool, and so issued an edict ordering that the people who had unusual talents to come to Chang'an to be examined by himself. Li Linfu, fearing that these examinees might accuse him of improprieties when they get to meet the emperor, suggested that these examinees go through two levels of preliminary examinations—by the local governments, and then by the executive bureau. As a result, no one passed the first two levels of preliminary examinations, and Li LInfu subsequently submitted a note to Emperor Xuanzong congratulating him that no talent has been overlooked by the imperial administration.

Meanwhile, Li Linfu was also apprehensive about how Wang Zhongsi, the military governor of Hexi, Longyou, Hedong (河東, headquartered in Taiyuan, Shanxi) and Shuofang (朔方, headquartered in Yinchuan, Ningxia) Circuits, had become increasingly powerful and might be promoted to be chancellor. When Wang subsequently interfered with the campaign that the general Dong Yanguang (董延光) against Tufan later in 747, Li took the opportunity to accuse Wang of plotting to overthrow Emperor Xuanzong and replace him with Li Heng—with whom Wang was raised together in the palace, as Wang's father Wang Haibin (王海賓) had been killed in battle while serving in the army, and Emperor Xuanzong, taking pity on the young child, raised him in the palace. At the effort of Wang's subordinate general Geshu Han, whom Emperor Xuanzong was impressed with, Wang escaped death but was removed from his post.

Meanwhile, Li Linfu also became apprehensive of Yang Shenjin's continued rise, and induced Yang's cousin's son Wang Hong (王鉷) to falsely accuse Yang, who was a descendant of Sui dynasty's emperors, of plotting to overthrow Tang and reestablish Sui. After Ji extracted confessions from the sorcerer Shi Jingzhong (史敬忠) implicating Yang, Yang and his brothers Yang Shenyu (楊慎餘) and Yang Shenming (楊慎名) were all forced to commit suicide. During these investigations, Li Linfu was repeatedly trying to implicate Li Heng, but as Emperor Xuanzong still trusted Li Heng, and Zhang Ji and Gao Lishi were doing all they could to protect Li Heng, he was never actually able to implicate Li Heng.

By this point, Li Linfu also feared that he had created too many enemies and that someone may try to assassinate him, expanded the corps of the chancellors' guards, with more than 100 guards protecting him at all times and establishment of elaborate security measures at home, including thick gates and walls and use of multiple bedrooms for himself, so that no one would know where he was sleeping on a certain night. He was also said to be living in extreme luxury, with one grand mansion in the capital itself and one country mansion, originally belonging to Li Xuan's father Li Ye (李業). He had a large group of concubines and servant woman, and he had 25 sons and 25 daughters. Three of his sons and five of his sons-in-law served in important positions. One daughter, Li Tengkong, became a Taoist nun.

Meanwhile, Li Linfu was described to be also responsible for a policy that Emperor Xuanzong implemented late in his reign—that non-Han generals were not only promoted to important border positions, but given large commands, as, prior to this point, border military commands were often viewed as stepping stones to chancellorships—and, just during Emperor Xuanzong's own reign, this had been the route that Xue Na, Guo Yuanzhen, Zhang Jiazhen, Wang Jun, Zhang Shuo, Du Xian, Xiao Song, Niu Xianke, and Li Shizhi used to reach the chancellorship. Li Linfu, wanting to cut this route off for potential enemies, argued that non-Han generals were less likely to be engaged in factionalism and were more likely to be brave in battles. By 748, the main border posts were commanded by four non-Han generals—An Lushan, An Sishun, Geshu, and Gao Xianzhi.

In 749, the commandery governor Zhao Fengzhang (趙奉璋) submitted a petition to Emperor Xuanzong accusing Li Linfu of over 20 crimes. Before the petition could arrive, however, Li Linfu already found out, and had Zhao arrested and caned to death.

By 750, however, a realistic threat against Li Linfu's power was rising—as Ji Wen and Yang Zhao, the cousin to Emperor Xuanzong's then-favorite concubine Consort Yang Yuhuan—were aligned with each other, and they had Li Linfu's close associates Xiao Jiong (蕭炅) and Song Hun (宋渾) demoted, to gradually reduce Li Linfu's power, with the intent of having Yang Zhao replace Li Linfu. Ji, soon, was also ingratiating An Lushan, and An was repeatedly recommending him. Subsequently, in 751, Ji was made the deputy military governor of Hedong, which was under An's command at the time.

Meanwhile, though, by 752, Wang Hong was having authorities rivaling LI Linfu's, but as Wang was carefully cultivating his relationship with Li Linfu and humble to Li Linfu, Li Linfu did not act against him. However, Wang Hong's brother Wang Han (王銲), who believed that he was destined to be emperor, planned a coup with his associate Xing Zai (邢縡). When Xing subsequently did rise in rebellion, the rebellion was suppressed by Gao, Wang Hong, and Yang Zhao (whose name was changed to Yang Guozhong by this point). Li Linfu subsequently tried to defend Wang Hong before Emperor Xuanzong, and Emperor Xuanzong initially took no actions against either Wang Hong or Wang Han, but was waiting for Wang Hong to submit a petition asking for punishment. When none came, Chen Xilie, who was also beginning to be antagonistic to Li Linfu, and Yang accused Wang Hong of being complicit. Wang Hong was forced to commit suicide, and Wang Han was caned to death, causing terror in Li Linfu's heart. He thus, while keeping his chancellorship, resigned his military governorship of Shuofang and had the command transferred to An Sishun instead. That, however, failed to stem the accusations that Yang, Chen, and Geshu were making that Li Linfu was associating with not only Wang Hong and Wang Han, but also the ethnically Tujue general Li Xianzhong (李獻忠), who rebelled in 752 as well.

With Nanzhao repeatedly attacking Jiannan Circuit (劍南, headquartered in modern Chengdu, Sichuan), Li Linfu tried to defuse Yang's threat to him by requesting that Yang, who was also military governor of Jiannan, be sent to Jiannan to defend against Nanzhao attacks. Despite Yang's repeated pleas, Emperor Xuanzong sent him on his way, but promised to recall him soon to be chancellor. Meanwhile, Li Linfu was seriously ill by this point, and when a sorcerer indicated that if the emperor looked at him, he would be cured, Emperor Xuanzong considered visiting him. Ultimately, though, at the opposition of the imperial attendants, Emperor Xuanzong did not do so, but had Li Linfu brought out to the courtyard of his mansion and then ascended a tower to look toward Li Linfu. This had no beneficial effect on Li Linfu's illness, however. Meanwhile, once Yang reached Jiannan, Emperor Xuanzong recalled him. When Yang, after arriving back in the capital, went to visit Li Linfu, Li Linfu tried to ingratiate him and entrust his family to Yang. Li Linfu died around the new year 753.

=== After death ===
After Li Linfu's death, Emperor Xuanzong initially awarded him a number of posthumous honors, including ordering a grand funeral with imperial guards serving as honor guards and the use of royal funeral items. However, in spring 753, Yang Guozhong induced An Lushan into accusing Li Linfu of having been complicit with Li Xianzhong's rebellion, and then had Li Linfu's son-in-law Yang Qixuan (楊齊宣) corroborate this. Before Li Linfu's funeral could be held, Emperor Xuanzong issued an edict stripping all of his honors and exiling his descendants. Li Linfu's casket was split open, and three of the funeral honors—the pearl in his mouth, the purple robe of chancellorship, and the golden fish to show rank—were stripped, and he was instead buried with ceremony fit for a mere commoner, in a small casket. It was said that while the people hated Li Linfu for his corrupt and harsh reign, they nevertheless mourned at how he was falsely accused after his death. After Li Heng later became emperor (as Emperor Suzong), he considered further infliction of humiliation on Li Linfu's body—by exhuming and burning it and scattering the ashes. At the suggestion of the imperial adviser Li Bi, however, he did not do so.

== In Fiction & popular Culture ==
- Portrayed by Kwok Fung in The Legend of Lady Yang. (2000)

== Notes and references ==
- Old Book of Tang, vol. 106.
- New Book of Tang, vol. 223, part 1.
- Zizhi Tongjian, vols. 213, 214, 215, 216.
