= Xiao Song =

Chinese historian, military general and politician

Xiao Song (Chinese: 蕭嵩; pinyin: Xiāo Sōng; 660s - 24 July 749), formally the Duke of Xu (徐公), was a Chinese historian, military general, and politician during the Tang dynasty, serving as a chancellor during the reign of Emperor Xuanzong.

== Background ==
Xiao Song was born during the reign of Emperor Gaozong of Tang. His family was descended from the imperial family of the Liang dynasty. His great-great-grandfather was Emperor Ming of Western Liang, and his great-granduncle Xiao Yu was a famed chancellor during the reigns of Tang dynasty's first two emperors, Emperor Gaozu and Emperor Taizong. Xiao Song's grandfather Xiao Jun (蕭鈞) was well known as a deputy head of the legislative bureau of government (中書省, Zhongshu Sheng) and Xiao Song's father Xiao Guan (蕭灌) served as a prefectural secretary general.

Xiao Song himself was described as handsome and tall, with a lengthy and beautiful beard. His wife was a daughter of one He Hui (賀晦), another daughter of whom married Lu Xiangxian. At that time, Lu, who was the son of the chancellor Lu Yuanfang, was already well known for his abilities while serving as the sheriff of Luoyang County—one of the two counties making up the then-capital Luoyang, while Xiao was not yet serving as an official. The guests were all rushing to greet Lu, while not paying much attention to Xiao. However, a fortuneteller, Xia Rong (夏榮), stated to Lu, "You, Master Lu, will reach the apex of officialdom in 10 years. However, Master Xiao's household will be thoroughly honored, and he will reach high positions and have a long life."

== During Emperor Zhongzong's second reign and Emperor Ruizong's second reign ==
In 705, during the second reign of Emperor Zhongzong, Xiao Song was made a military officer at Ming Prefecture (洺州, in modern Handan, Hebei). When the chancellor Huan Yanfan was demoted to be the prefect of Ming Prefecture, Huan was impressed with him and treated him with respect. In 710, when Emperor Zhongzong's brother Emperor Ruizong was emperor, Xiao was serving as the sheriff of Liquan County (醴泉, in modern Xianyang, Shaanxi) when Lu Xiangxian, then serving as the deputy head of the legislative bureau, recommended him to be Jiancha Yushi (監察御史), an imperial censor. When Lu became chancellor in 711, Xiao was promoted within the censor ranks.

== During Emperor Xuanzong's reign ==
Early in the Kaiyuan era (713–741) of Emperor Ruizong's son Emperor Xuanzong, Xiao Song became Zhongshu Sheren (中書舍人), a mid-level official at the legislative bureau, serving alongside Cui Lin (崔琳), Wang Qiu (王丘), and Qi Huan (齊澣). It was said that among these officials, Xiao was considered to be unknowledgeable and therefore not considered seriously. However, their superior Yao Chong felt that Xiao had good foresight and respected him. He later successively served as the prefect of Sòng Prefecture; Shangshu Zuo Cheng (尚書左丞), one of the secretaries in general of the executive bureau (尚書省, Shangshu Sheng); and deputy minister of defense (兵部侍郎, Bingbu Shilang). He participated in government reactions to a Yellow River levee break at Bo Prefecture (博州, roughly modern Liaocheng, Shandong).

In 726, Xiao was given the title of minister of defense (兵部尚書, Bingbu Shangshu) and made the military governor (jiedushi) of Shuofang Circuit (朔方, headquartered in modern Yinchuan, Ningxia). In 727, having been aggravated by constant attacks by the Tang general Wang Junchuo (王君㚟) the military governor of Hexi Circuit (河西, headquartered in modern Wuwei, Gansu), generals We Tadra Khonglo ("Xinuoluo Gonglu" (悉諾邏恭祿) in Chinese) and Zhulongmangbu (燭龍莽布) of the Tibetan Empire launched a major attack on Gua Prefecture (瓜州, roughly Jiuquan, Gansu) and captured its prefect Tian Yuanxian (田元獻) and Wang Junchuo's father Wang Shou (王壽). In the aftermaths, Wang Junchuo falsely accused the tribal chieftains of the Uyghur Khaganate, Huns (渾), Kibirs (Ch. Qibi 契苾), and Esegels (a.k.a. Izgil, Old Turkic: 𐰔𐰏𐰠, Ch. Asijie, Sijie 思結) of treason and had them exiled. In anger, Yaoluoge Hushu (藥羅葛護輸), the nephew of the Uyghur chieftain Yaoluoge Chengzong (藥羅葛承宗), launched a surprise raid against Wang, killing him. Emperor Xuanzong moved Xiao from Shuofang to Hexi. Xiao retained a number of officials that were considered capable—Pei Kuan (裴寬), Guo Xuji (郭虛己), and Niu Xianke, and recommended the general Zhang Shougui (張守珪) to serve as the prefect of Gua Prefecture. Zhang rebuilt Gua Prefecture's defenses and comforted the people. Emperor Xuanzong, hearing this, gave him the honorific title Yinqing Guanglu Daifu (銀青光祿大夫). Meanwhile, Xiao had spies create rumors in the Tibetan Empire that We Tadra Khonglo was conspiring with Tang—which the Tibetan emperor Me Agtsom believed, and Me Agtsom summoned We Tadra Khonglo and killed him.

In 728, another Tibetan general, Ximolang (悉莫朗), attacked Gua Prefecture. Xiao and the military governor of Longyou Circuit (隴右, headquartered in modern Haidong Prefecture, Qinghai) then counterattacked, and defeated Tibetan forces at Kepo Canyon (渴波谷), west of Qinghai Lake. Later that year, he sent the general Du Binke (杜賓客) to defend against another Tibetan attack, and Du defeated Tibetan forces at Qilian (祁連, in modern Zhangye, Gansu). When the unsealed reports of the victory arrived at the capital Chang'an, Emperor Xuanzong was pleased, and he recalled Xiao to Chang'an to serve as minister of defense; he also gave Xiao the designation Tong Zhongshu Menxia Pingzhangshi (同中書門下平章事), making him a chancellor de facto.

In 729, when Emperor Xuanzong became displeased at the conflict between Xiao's fellow chancellors Li Yuanhong and Du Xian, as well as the senior chancellor Yuan Qianyao's inability to moderate them, Emperor Xuanzong removed all three from their chancellor positions and replaced them with Yuwen Rong and Pei Guangting. He also made Xiao Zhongshu Ling (中書令), the head of the legislative bureau and a post considered one for a chancellor—a post that had not been held since Zhang Shuo was removed in 726. Xiao was also given the military governorship of Hexi again, but remained at Chang'an and did not report to Hexi. (Yuwen was removed later that year, and so Xiao served alongside only Pei from that point on.) Xiao was made an imperial scholar at Jixian Institute (集賢院) and put in charge of editing the imperial history; he was also given the honorific title of Jinzi Guanglu Daifu (金紫光祿大夫). Emperor Xuanzong gave his daughter Princess Xinchang to Xiao's son Xiao Heng (蕭衡) in marriage. Sometime thereafter, Xiao Song was created the Duke of Xu. He, believing Niu, serving as acting military governor in his absence, to be capable, repeatedly recommended Niu, and eventually, his military governorship was given to Niu.

Emperor Xuanzong had put Zhang Shuo in charge of revising the rite regulations. After Zhang died in 731, Xiao was put in charge, and in 732, the revisions were complete and became known as the Kaiyuan Rites (開元禮).

In 733, Pei died. Emperor Xuanzong asked Xiao for his recommendation for someone to succeed Pei. Xiao wanted to recommend his friend and old colleague Wang Qiu, who was then serving as a senior advisor at the examination bureau (門下省, Menxia Sheng). Wang declined and recommended Han Xiu instead, and so Xiao recommended Han. Han was thus made chancellor to replace Pei. Han had a reputation for being peaceful, so Xiao believed that he could easily be controlled, but once Han became chancellor, Han did not bow to Xiao's wishes, often arguing with Xiao before Emperor Xuanzong and pointing out Xiao's shortcomings. This caused Emperor Xuanzong's displeasure, and Xiao offered to resign. Emperor Xuanzong asked Xiao, "I am not tired of you. Why do you want to leave?" Xiao responded:

I have received great grace to serve as chancellor, and I have reached the peak of honor and wealth. It is precisely because Your Imperial Majesty is not tired of me that I can leave without trouble. If you are tired of me, I will not even be able to keep my head.

Xiao then began to cry, and Emperor Xuanzong was touched, responding, "Leave my presence for the time being. I will think of a solution." Emperor Xuanzong then removed both Xiao and Han as chancellors, making Xiao Zuo Chengxiang (左丞相), one of the heads of the executive bureau, instead. He replaced Xiao and Han with Pei Yaoqing and Zhang Jiuling. Soon thereafter, he made Xiao's son Xiao Hua an imperial attendant. In 734, when a major earthquake occurred at Qin Prefecture (秦州, roughly modern Tianshui, Gansu), causing more than 4,000 deaths, Emperor Xuanzong had Xiao head the disaster relief efforts.

In 736, Xiao was made a senior advisor to Li Yu the Crown Prince. Soon thereafter, however, Zhang Shougui was discovered to have bribed the eunuch Niu Xiantong (牛仙童) and demoted. Then-chancellor Li Linfu, apprehensive that Xiao might return to the chancellorship at some point, accused Xiao of bribing Niu Xiantong as well and had him demoted to be the prefect of Qing Prefecture (青州, roughly modern Weifang, Shandong). Xiao was, however, soon recalled to again be senior advisor to Li Yu, although he soon retired.

Xiao had long been taking herbal medicines, and once he left the chancellorship, he began to grow his own herbs for his own use. At that time, Xiao Hua served as a deputy minister, and Xiao Heng was an imperial son-in-law. Xiao Song thus spent more than a decade in retirement in great honor and wealth. He died in 749 and was given posthumous honors, although no posthumous name was recorded for him. Among his descendants, Xiao Hua, Xiao Hua's grandsons Xiao Mian and Xiao Fang, and Xiao Heng's son Xiao Fu all later served as chancellors.
