= Niu Xianke =

Niu Xianke (Chinese: 牛仙客) (675 – September 2, 742), formally Duke Zhenjian of Bin (豳貞簡公), was a general and official of the Chinese Tang dynasty. He served as a chancellor during the reign of Emperor Xuanzong of Tang. He took an unconventional path to the position of chancellor by starting as a low-level bureaucrat and gradually getting promoted, rather than going through the imperial examinations, and was known for being careful and obedient to fellow chancellor Li Linfu.

== Background ==
Niu Xianke was born in 675. He was from Jing Prefecture (涇州, roughly modern Pingliang, Gansu). His family traced its ancestry to the Han dynasty military official Niu Han (牛邯), whose descendants later settled in the region that became Jing Prefecture. His family was not prominent in political circles, as, unlike most other chancellors of the time, there were no records of any other ancestors of his serving as officials. All that were recorded about his great-grandfather Niu Tong (牛通), grandfather Niu Hui (牛會), and father Niu Yi (牛意) were their names.

Niu Xianke himself initially served as a minor bureaucrat in his home county of Chungu (鶉觚, in modern Pingliang), and was respected by the county magistrate Fu Wenjing (傅文靜). Fu was later charged with the operation of military farming settlements in the Longyou (隴右, modern eastern Gansu) region, and he brought Niu with him as an aid. For Niu's contributions in military matters, he was eventually promoted to military adviser to the prefect of Tao Prefecture (洮州, roughly modern Gannan Tibetan Autonomous Prefecture, Gansu).

== During Emperor Xuanzong's reign ==
Early in the Kaiyuan era (713-741) of Emperor Xuanzong of Tang, the general Wang Junchuo (王君㚟) served as the jiedushi, a military commissioner, of Hexi (河西, headquartered in Wuwei, Gansu). Niu Xianke and Song Zhen (宋貞) served as his assistants and were his close associates. In 727 Wang and Song were killed in an ambush by the Uyghur tribal leader Yaoluoge Hushu (藥羅葛護輸), but Niu was able to escape. Subsequently, Niu and Pei Kuan (裴寬) served under the general Xiao Song, the jiedushi of Hexi who replaced Wang. Xiao entrusted much responsibility to Niu, and Niu was said to be honest and hard-working. He began to impress prominent people of the region despite his humble origins. After Xiao became chancellor in 728, Niu was made the secretary general of Liang Prefecture (涼州, roughly modern Wuwei) and acting jiedushi of Hexi through Xiao's recommendation. Xiao continual praise eventually led to Niu's promotion to full jiedushi. While serving as jiedushi, Niu was known to be frugal and saved a large surplus for the governmental treasury, and also had good armor and weapons made.

In 736, Niu replaced Xuanzong's second cousin Li Hui (李褘) the Prince of Xin'an as jiedushi of Shuofang (朔方, roughly modern Yinchuan, Ningxia), and the official Cui Xiyi (崔希逸) replaced Niu as jiedushi of Hexi. Cui was impressed with the amount of treasury as well as supply of armor and weapons that had been stockpiled in Hexi, and he reported this to Xuanzong. Xuanzong sent the official Zhang Lizhen (張利貞) to verify this, and once confirmation had been sent, was exceedingly pleased. He wanted to promote Niu to minister of defense (兵部尚書, Bingbu Shangshu) and wanted to create him a title—both actions were opposed by the chancellor Zhang Jiuling, on the basis that Niu, not learned, was unsuitable to be minister of a major ministry, and that being honest and frugal were part of his responsibility, not something that should be awarded with a title. This drew Xuanzong's displeasure, and another chancellor, Li Linfu, seeing this, advocated for Niu's creation as a duke. Xuanzong agreed and created Niu the Duke of Longxi. Later that year Zhang offended Xuanzong further and Xuanzong removed him and his friend and fellow chancellor Pei Yaoqing from office. He made Niu the minister of public works (工部尚書, Gongbu Shangshu) and designated him as Tong Zhongshu Menxia Sanpin (同中書門下三品), making him a chancellor de facto, to serve alongside Li Linfu, while still letting him keep the post in Shuofang. As chancellor, it was said that Niu was careful and frugal, and did not dare to make any key decisions, deferring all of them to Li Linfu.

In 737, the imperial censor Zhou Ziliang (周子諒) submitted an indictment against Niu, arguing that he did not have qualifications to be chancellor, and further cited a prophecy that indicated that a person named Niu would harm the empire. Xuanzong, in anger, had Zhou caned and then exiled, and Zhou died on the way. As Zhou had been recommended by Zhang, Li Linfu used this opportunity to attack Zhang, and Zhang was exiled from the capital. Later that year the deputy chief judge of the supreme court, Xu Jiao (徐嶠), submitted a flattering report to Xuanzong, pointing out that capital punishment had become almost unnecessary due to the peacefulness of his reign. Xuanzong was pleased and credited the chancellors. He thus created Li Linfu the Duke of Jin and Niu the Duke of Bin. It was also around this time that a revision of the laws, led by Li Linfu, Niu, and the officials in charge of the justice system, was completed.

In 738, Niu was made Shizhong (侍中), the head of the examination bureau (門下省, Menxia Sheng), a post considered one for a chancellor; he was also made the deputy jiedushi of Hedong Circuit (河東, headquartered in modern Taiyuan, Shanxi), but remained at the capital Chang'an to serve as chancellor. He was further given the additional post of minister of defense in 739 and was responsible for selecting military officers, just as Li Linfu was made the minister of civil service affairs and was responsible for selecting officials. In 740, he was stripped of his commands of Shuofang and Hedong, but remained chancellor.

In 742, Niu was gravely ill. His former assistant at Shuofang, Yao Hong (姚閎), a grandson of the deceased chancellor Yao Chong, had been favored by him due to Yao Hong's dabbling in supernatural matters and claimed to know how to avoid misfortune. He recommended Yao to serve as imperial censor. Now that he was ill, he asked Yao to pray for him—and Yao did so but forced Niu to recommend Yao's uncle Yao Yi (姚弈) and the official Lu Huan (盧奐) to replace Niu himself as chancellor. Yao Hong went as far as writing out the petition and forcing Niu to sign, but Niu was so ill that he was unable to sign properly. Niu died in fall 742. After his death, his wife, when imperial messengers came to mourn him, showed the imperial messengers a petition to accuse Yao Hong of extortion. In anger, Xuanzong forced Yao Hong to commit suicide and demoted Yao Yi and Lu. He awarded Niu posthumous honors.

== Notes and references ==
- Old Book of Tang, vol. 103.
- New Book of Tang, vol. 133
- Zizhi Tongjian, vols. 213, 214, 215.
