= Han Xiu =

Chinese politician

Han Xiu (simplified Chinese: 韩休; traditional Chinese: 韓休; pinyin: Hán Xiū) (672–739), courtesy name Liangshi (良士), formally Viscount Wenzhong of Yiyang (宜陽文忠子), was a Chinese politician during the Tang dynasty, briefly serving as chancellor during the reign of Emperor Xuanzong. His wife was called Liu (died in 784). He was known for his bluntness and honesty.

== Background ==
Han Xiu was born in 672, during the reign of Emperor Gaozong. His family was from the Tang dynasty capital Chang'an and traced its ancestry to the royal house of the Warring States period state Han. It also claimed, as ancestors, a line of officials during Han dynasty, Jin dynasty (266–420), Northern Wei, Northern Qi, Northern Zhou, Sui dynasty, and Tang. Han Xiu's grandfather Han Fu (韓符) served as a prefectural prefect during Tang, and Han Xiu's father Han Dazhi (韓大智) served as a census official at the eastern capital Luoyang. Han Xiu's uncle Han Damin (韓大敏) was a more-known official who, during the early reign of Emperor Gaozong's wife Wu Zetian, refused to falsely implicate the official Li Xingbao (李行褒), and ultimately, when Wu Zetian executed Li Xingbao anyway, was forced to commit suicide.

Han Xiu was known for his literary abilities and knowledge, and after he passed the imperial examinations, he was made the secretary general of Taolin County (桃林, in modern Sanmenxia, Henan). During the second reign of Emperor Gaozong's and Wu Zetian's son Emperor Ruizong, Emperor Ruizong's son and crown prince Li Longji (the later Emperor Xuanzong) was personally examining a number of recommended junior officials. Han and Zhao Dongxi (趙冬曦) received the highest ratings, and Han was promoted to be Zuo Bujue (左補闕), a low level official at the examination bureau of government (門下省, Menxia Sheng). He was subsequently made Zhujue Yuanwailang (主爵員外郎), a low level official at the ministry of civil service affairs (吏部, Libu). He subsequently successively served as Zhongshu Sheren (中書舍人), a mid-level official at the legislative bureau (中書省, Zhongshu Sheng); and deputy minister of rites (禮部侍郎, Libu Shilang), where he was in charge of drafting imperial edicts.

== During Emperor Xuanzong's reign ==
In 724, while Han Xiu was still serving as deputy minister of rites, he was, as a part of Emperor Xuanzong's attempts to increase the prestige of the prefectural prefects by selecting officials with good reputations to serve, sent to Guo Prefecture (虢州, in modern Sanmenxia). Guo Prefecture was positioned between Chang'an and Luoyang, and as the emperor often travelled between the two capitals, it was often disturbed by the size of the imperial train and often was required to carry out labor. Han thus requested a tax exemption for the people of the prefecture—which the chancellor Zhang Shuo initially rejected. Han repetitioned for the exemption. When his subordinates warned him that this might offend Zhang, Han responded:

If a prefect cannot save his people from suffering, why bother governing? If I am punished for offending my superior, I am willing to accept the punishment.

Han's petition was eventually accepted. After about a year, he left civil service to observe a mourning period for his mother, and at his insistence, was allowed to serve out the three-year period. After the mourning period was over, he was recalled to serve as the deputy minister of public works (工部侍郎, Gongbu Shilang) and was again in charge of drafting edicts. Subsequently, he was promoted to be Shangshu You Cheng (尚書右丞), one of the secretaries general for the executive bureau (尚書省, Shangshu Sheng).

In 733, after the chancellor Pei Guangting died, Emperor Xuanzong asked Pei's fellow chancellor Xiao Song for a recommendation. Xiao was set to recommend his friend Wang Qiu (王丘), but Wang declined and recommended Han instead. Xiao, believing Han to be meek and easy to control, recommended Han. Emperor Xuanzong thus made Han the Huangmen Shilang (黃門侍郎), the deputy head of the examination bureau, and gave him the designation of Tong Zhongshu Menxia Pingzhangshi (同中書門下平章事), making him a chancellor de facto.

Despite Xiao's hopes to dominate his junior colleague, Han turned out to be stern and not bending simply to Xiao's will, impressing the senior official Song Jing with his determination. It was also said that he was willing to speak bluntly, sometimes offending Emperor Xuanzong but earning his respect. On one occasion, when Li Meiyu (李美玉) the sheriff of Wannian County (萬年, one of the two counties making up Chang'an) was accused of an offense unspecified in historical accounts. Emperor Xuanzong ordered that Li be exiled to the Lingnan region. Han responded:

Li Meiyu is in a low position and did not commit a serious crime. The imperial administration currently has a major criminal that has not yet been removed; why should this major criminal be overlooked while the minor offender be exiled? I, your subject, see that the Grand General Jinwu Cheng Boxian, because of the favors that Your Imperial Majesty has shown him, is greedy and corrupt, and he has built houses and ridden on horses beyond propriety. I request that Cheng be punished before Li.

Emperor Xuanzong initially refused, but Han spoke further:

You cannot even tolerate the minor offense of Li, so how can the grand treachery of Cheng be overlooked? If Your Imperial Majesty cannot expel Cheng, I cannot follow your edict and exile Li.

Emperor Xuanzong, impressed with Han's blunt talk, agreed. It was also said that whenever Emperor Xuanzong was being overly pleasure-seeking or wasteful in the palace, he would turn to his servants and ask, "Do you think Han Xiu knows this?" and that soon thereafter, a petition would arrive from Han urging him to change the behavior. It was also said that when one of the servants made the comment, "Since Han Xiu became chancellor, Your Imperial Majesty has become thinner and thinner. Why not send him away?" Emperor Xuanzong responded:

Even though I am thin, the empire is getting fattened. Every time Xiao Song made reports to me, he followed my desires, but when I return to the palace and think about the empire, I cannot sleep well. Han often criticized and tried to correct me. When I return to the palace and think about the empire, I sleep well. I use Han Xiu for the state.

(The modern Chinese historian Bo Yang, however, doubted the truth about Han's timely petitions and also the extent of Emperor Xuanzong's respect for him, pointing out that, at that time, leaking the news about the events in the palace was considered a major offense.)

Emperor Xuanzong gave Han the honorific title Yinqing Guanglu Daifu (銀青光祿大夫). However, soon, Han drew Emperor Xuanzong's displeasure by repeatedly criticizing Xiao, leading to Xiao's offering to retire. Emperor Xuanzong, touched by Xiao's tearful request, removed both from chancellor positions later in 733 and made Han the minister of public works (工部尚書, Gongbu Shangshu).

In 736, Han was made an advisor to Li Ying the Crown Prince and created the Viscount of Yiyang. He died in 739 and was given posthumous honors. He was buried in Guozhuang Tang tomb. His sons Han Hao (韓浩), Han Qia (韓洽), Han Hun (韓渾), Han Hong (韓洪), Han Hong (韓汯, note different character than his brother), Han Huang, and Han Hui (韓洄) all served as officials, and Han Huang was particularly powerful as a regional governor during the reign of Emperor Xuanzong's great-grandson Emperor Dezong and briefly served as chancellor.
