= Li Daoguang =

Li Daoguang (李道廣), courtesy name Taiqiu (太丘), formally Marquess Cheng of Jincheng (金城成侯), was an official of Wu Zetian's Zhou dynasty, serving as chancellor for about two years.

== Background ==
It is not known when Li Daoguang was born. His family was originally from what would become Hua Prefecture (滑州, roughly modern Anyang, Henan), but by Li Daoguang's time had moved to the Tang dynasty capital Chang'an. The family claimed to be descended from the Han dynasty general Li Ling, who had surrendered to Xiongnu after being surrounded. According to their claims, an ancestor of theirs and descendant of Li Ling eventually became a subject of Northern Wei and, as he met the Northern Wei emperor at Bing Hall (丙殿), was given the family name of Bing. Li Daoguang's great-grandfather Bing Ming (丙明) served as a commandant during Sui dynasty and was created the Duke of Longju. Li Daoguang's grandfather Bing Can (丙粲) later became a subject of the Tang dynasty, as he was an acquaintance of Tang's founder Emperor Gaozu; Emperor Gaozu created him the Duke of Ying. In order to observe naming taboo for Emperor Gaozu's father Li Bing (李昺), Emperor Gaozu had the Bing family's name changed to Li. Li Daoguang's father Li Kuan (李寬) served as the minister of worship during the reign of Emperor Gaozu's grandson Emperor Gaozong and carried the title of Duke of Longxi.

== During Wu Zetian's reign ==
During the reign of Emperor Gaozong's wife Wu Zetian (r. 690–705), Li Daoguang served as the prefect of Bian Prefecture (汴州, roughly modern Kaifeng, Henan). During successive Khitan and Eastern Tujue incursions in 696, all of the prefectures south and north of the Yellow River were panicking, but under Li's governance, Bian Prefecture was not disturbed. Later that year, he was recalled serving as director of palace affairs (殿中監, Dianzhong Jian), and Wu Zetian gave him the designation Tong Fengge Luantai Pingzhangshi (同鳳閣鸞臺平章事), making him a chancellor de facto. He was also created the Marquess of Jincheng. In 697, he was also made the acting secretary general of the capital prefecture Luo Prefecture (洛州, roughly modern Luoyang, Henan). In 698, he was removed from his chancellor position and again made prefect of Bian Prefecture. That was the last reference to Li Daoguang in history, and it is not known when he died, although it is known that he was given posthumous honors. His son Li Yuanhong later served as a chancellor during the reign of Wu Zetian's grandson Emperor Xuanzong.

== Notes and references ==
- Old Book of Tang, vol. 98.
- New Book of Tang, vol. 126.
- Zizhi Tongjian, vol. 205.
