= Yuwen Rong =

Tang dynasty politician

Yuwen Rong (Chinese: 宇文融) (d. 730 or 731) was a Chinese economist and politician, serving as a chancellor for 100 days during the reign of Emperor Xuanzong. He was said to be the first official during Emperor Xuanzong's reign who became powerful on account of his ability to increase government revenue.

== Background ==
Yuwen Rong's family was from the Tang dynasty capital Chang'an, and traced its ancestry to Yuwen Yidougui, the last chief of the Xianbei tribe Yuwen, which was destroyed by the Former Yan ruler Murong Huang. His great-grandfather Yuwen Bi (宇文弼) was a major general for Tang's predecessor Sui dynasty, and Yuwen Rong's grandfather Yuwen Jie served as a chancellor during the reign of Emperor Gaozong of Tang. Yuwen Rong's father Yuwen Jiao (宇文嶠) served as a prefectural secretary general.

== During Emperor Xuanzong's reign ==
Early in the Kaiyuan era (713-741) of Emperor Xuanzong, Yuwen Rong served as the treasurer for Fuping County (富平, in modern Weinan, Shaanxi), which was then part of Jingzhao Municipality (i.e., the municipality encompassing Chang'an), and was said to be capable in that capacity. While the officials Yuan Qianyao and Meng Wen (孟溫) successively served as the mayors of Jingzhao, both of them respected his abilities. He later served as Jiancha Yushi (監察御史), an imperial censor. At that time, there were many people who tried to evade labor conscription and taxes by avoiding being enrolled on census rolls, or fraudulently claiming exemptions, causing a drain on the imperial treasury. In 721, Yuwen requested that he be specially commissioned to go after census evaders and fraudulent exemption claimers, and, with support from Yuan, who was then a chancellor, Emperor Xuanzong agreed. Yuwen was able to locate some 800,000 alleged census evaders—although traditional historians believed that this figure was inflated—adding much to the imperial treasury. When the county magistrate Huangfu Jing (皇甫憬) submitted a petition arguing that this was causing a panic among the people, Emperor Xuanzong moved Huangfu to a more distant county as punishment. When the deputy minister of census Yang Yang (楊暘) also pointed this out, Yang was sent out of the capital. Subsequently, apparently at Yuwen's urging, Emperor Xuanzong issued an amnesty period for the census evaders to report themselves and allowed them to be exempted from retroactive taxation. When Yuwen toured the realm to announce this, the census evaders, not realizing his earlier role in investigations into them, were exceedingly thankful to him. For his role in the project, Yuwen was promoted to be the deputy imperial censor (御史中丞, Yushi Zhongcheng).

In 725, Emperor Xuanzong gave Yuwen the additional office as deputy minister of census (戶部侍郎, Hubu Shilang). He also decreed that the grains submitted as taxes by the census evaders were to be put aside in storage in case of famine, and also established agriculture promotion offices in the prefectures and counties to try to enhance agriculture. Later that year, when Emperor Xuanzong suspected the ministry of civil service affairs to be unfair in its selection of officials, Yuwen suggested that he appoint 10 officials to review the selections, and then further review the 10 examiners' decisions. Emperor Xuanzong agreed and carried out the plan, despite objections submitted by the official Wu Jing (吳兢), although in 726 he stopped the scheme.

Meanwhile, it was said that the senior chancellor Zhang Yue despised Yuwen, but also did not view him as a threat, despite warnings from his subordinate Zhang Jiuling. In 726, Yuwen, along with Li Linfu and another official who resented Zhang Yue, Cui Yinfu (崔隱甫), submitted accusations of corruption against Zhang Yue. Subsequently, Zhang was removed from his chancellor position, but at the intercession of the powerful eunuch Gao Lishi, avoided further punishment. Fearing that Zhang Yue would eventually return to the chancellor position, Yuwen and Cui formed a faction with other officials, against Zhang Yue and his faction. In 727, Emperor Xuanzong, tired of that situation, ordered Zhang Yue to retire, Cui to return home to serve his mother, and demoted Yuwen to be the prefect of Wei Prefecture (魏州, in modern Handan, Hebei). In 728, Emperor Xuanzong gave Yuwen the additional posts as the examiner of Hebei Circuit (河北道, roughly modern Hebei, Beijing, and Tianjin) as well as deputy minister of census. Later that year, he made Yuwen the prefect of Bian Prefecture (汴州, roughly modern Kaifeng, Henan), and gave Yuwen the additional responsibility of managing the Yellow River levees. Yuwen proposed that the ancient routes of the Yellow River—when the lower Yellow River divided into nine river routes—be located, and that the routes be used for irrigation of rice fields; further, he also proposed that the routes could then be used for transportation. Emperor Xuanzong approved of the plan, which however did not have much progress despite expenses.

In 729, tired of the constant arguments between the chancellors Li Yuanhong and Du Xian, and Yuan's inabilities to moderate them, Emperor Xuanzong removed all three from chancellor positions, replacing them with Yuwen and Pei Guangting—with Yuwen given the position of Huangmen Shilang (黃門侍郎), the deputy head of the examination bureau of government (門下省, Menxia Sheng), and given the de facto chancellor designation of Tong Zhongshu Menxia Pingzhangshi (同中書門下平章事). It was said that Yuwen tried to further increase revenues by establish special offices, which caused the previously commissioned officials to have much less responsibilities. It was further said that Yuwen was intelligent and capable in increasing revenues, drawing Emperor Xuanzong's favor, but was frivolous, talkative, and nepotistic, once commenting, "Let me sit on this seat for a few months, and the realm will have no troubles." However, it was also said that he was praised for recommending the well-respected officials Song Jing, Pei Yaoqing, and Xu Jingxian (許景先). He soon became jealous of another favorite of Emperor Xuanzong's -- Emperor Xuanzong's second cousin Li Hui (李褘) the Prince of Xin'an, who had drawn Emperor Xuanzong's favor for his contributions as a general and was then the military governor (jiedushi) of Shuofang Circuit (朔方, headquartered in modern Yinchuan, Ningxia). Yuwen persuaded the imperial censor Li Zhou (李宙) to submit an indictment against Li Hui, but the news was leaked to Li Hui. Li Hui, finding out he was to be indicted, reported this to Emperor Xuanzong through Emperor Xuanzong's sister Li Chiying (李持盈) the Princess Yuzhen and Gao, defending himself. When Li Zhou, as Li Hui had predicted, submitted the indictment, Emperor Xuanzong knew that it was at Yuwen's urging and became angry at them. He demoted Yuwen to be the prefect of Ru Prefecture (汝州, roughly modern Zhumadian, Henan) -- after serving 100 days as chancellor.

However, after Yuwen's removal, it was said that revenues decreased sharply, and Emperor Xuanzong questioned Pei Guangting and other officials who had criticized Yuwen, "You all claim that Yuwen Rong is evil, and I have removed him. Now, what should we do if there is not enough money in the treasury? What are you here for?" Pei and the other officials were fearful and unable to answer, but Emperor Xuanzong did not punish them. Meanwhile, as Pei was also serving as chief imperial censor by this point, he submitted an indictment against Yuwen for corruption and improper association with others, and he was demoted to be the sheriff of Pingle County (平樂, in modern Guilin, Guangxi). After he had spent more than a year at Pingle, the deputy minister Jiang Cen (蔣岑) further accused Yuwen of corruption while serving as prefect of Bian Prefecture. Yuwen was thus further removed as sheriff and exiled to Yan Prefecture (巖州, roughly modern Laibin, Guangxi). It was said that the environment of Yan Prefecture was humid and unhealthy, causing Yuwen to be ill. He thus went on sick leave in Guang Prefecture (廣州, roughly modern Guangzhou, Guangdong). After his leave was to be over, however, he remained in Guang Prefecture, causing the commandant of Guang Prefecture, Geng Renzhong (耿仁忠) to force him to leave. He died on the way back to Yan Prefecture. When Emperor Xuanzong heard this, he remembered Yuwen's contributions and posthumously made him a prefectural prefect.

== Notes and references ==
- Old Book of Tang, vol. 105.
- New Book of Tang, vol. 134.
- Zizhi Tongjian, vols. 212, 213.
