= Li Tengkong =

Li Tengkong (Chinese: 李騰空; pinyin: Lǐ Téngkōng; fl. mid-8th century) was a Tang dynasty Taoist priestess. While her father Li Linfu was still serving as chancellor under Emperor Xuanzong, Li retreated from public life and entered the Jiayou convent (嘉猷觀) in Chang'an. Possibly after her father's death, Li relocated to Mount Lu. According to tradition, Li mastered the sandong fa (三洞法) or "methods of the three caverns" while at Mount Lu and was subsequently able to heal the sick with fulu and medicine.

In 761, the poet Li Bai and his wife visited Li Tengkong. He wrote two poems recounting the occasion, collectively titled Song nei xun Lushan nüdaoshi Li Tengkong ershou (送內尋廬山女道士李騰空二首). (Note: Translated into English as "Seeing Off My Wife, as She Sets Out Seeking the Daoist Nun Li Tengkong on Mount Lu, Two Verses".)
