= Pei Guangting =

Pei Guangting (Chinese: 裴光庭; pinyin: Péi Guāngtíng; 676 - March 27, 733), courtesy name Liancheng (連城), formally Baron Zhongxian of Zhengping (正平忠獻男), was a Chinese diplomat, politician, and writer during the Tang dynasty and Wu Zetian's Zhou dynasty, serving as a chancellor during the reign of Emperor Xuanzong. He instituted a seniority-based system of promotion for the Tang civil service system, and was often blamed by traditional historians for limiting the rise of talented officials in the subsequent years of Emperor Xuanzong's reign.

== Background ==
Pei Guangting's family was the Pei clan of Hedong from Jiang Prefecture (絳州, in modern Yuncheng, Shanxi) and traced its ancestry to a line of officials of the Han dynasty, Jin dynasty (266–420), Former Liang, Southern Qi, Northern Wei, Northern Zhou, and Tang dynasty. Pei Guangting, born in 676, was a son of Pei Xingjian (裴行儉), a renowned general during the reign of Emperor Gaozong. When Pei Xingjian died in 682, Pei Guangting was just six. During the reign of Emperor Gaozong's wife Wu Zetian (r. 690–705), she summoned Pei Guangting's mother Lady Kudi into the palace and made her a senior lady in waiting; as a result, Pei Guangting was promoted, eventually to be the Taichang Cheng (太常丞), the secretary general at the ministry of worship. He married a daughter of Wu Zetian's nephew Wu Sansi the Prince of Liang. During the second reign of Emperor Gaozong's and Wu Zetian's son Emperor Ruizong (r. 710–712), Wu Sansi was posthumously denounced, and Pei, because he was Wu Sansi's son-in-law, was demoted to be the military advisor to the prefect of Ying Prefecture (郢州, roughly modern Wuhan, Hubei).

== During Emperor Xuanzong's reign ==
Early in the Kaiyuan era (713–741) of Emperor Ruizong's son Emperor Xuanzong, Pei Guangting was recalled, initially to be an officer in the imperial guards, and subsequently as a low-level official (郎中, Langzhong) at the ministry of justice (刑部, Xingbu) and then at the ministry of defense (兵部, Bingbu). It was said that in his youth, Pei was known for being silent and being a loner, and when he was promoted, he was not well-regarded. Once he started his service, however, he was said to be well-organized, drawing praise and respect.

In 725, when Emperor Xuanzong was set to offer sacrifices to heaven and earth at Mount Tai, the chancellor Zhang Shuo, a major proponent of the sacrifices, was apprehensive that certain hostile foreign powers may take the opportunity to attack, and considered fortifying the borders. He discussed the matter with Pei. Pei pointed out that the sacrifices at Mount Tai were intended to show the power of the state, and fortifying the borders would in fact show apprehension, not power. Instead, he pointed out that among the foreign powers, Eastern Tujue was the strongest, and that if the Eastern Tujue khan Ashina Mojilian would be willing to show submission by sending a key official to attend to Emperor Xuanzong, then the other foreign states would do so as well. Zhang was impressed with his proposal and submitted it to Emperor Xuanzong, and Emperor Xuanzong agreed. Subsequently, Pei was made the deputy minister of vassal affairs (鴻臚少卿, Honglu Shaoqing). After Emperor Xuanzong returned from Mount Tai, Pei was made the deputy minister of defense (兵部侍郎, Bingbu Shilang).

In 729, Emperor Xuanzong, displeased that then-chancellors Li Yuanhong and Du Xian were constantly arguing and fellow chancellor Yuan Qianyao was unable to moderate them, removed all three from chancellor positions, replacing them with Pei and Yuwen Rong. On 15 July, Pei was appointed Zhongshu Shilang (中書侍郎), the deputy head of the legislative bureau of government (中書省, Zhongshu Sheng) and made chancellor with the designation Tong Zhongshu Menxia Pingzhangshi (同中書門下平章事). They served alongside Xiao Song. After just 100 days, Yuwen, who became favored by Emperor Xuanzong because of his ability to increase government revenues, was removed for wrongly accusing another favorite of Emperor Xuanzong's, his second cousin Li Hui (李禕) the Prince of Xin'an. However, after Yuwen's removal, it was said that revenues decreased sharply, and Emperor Xuanzong questioned Pei and other officials who had criticized Yuwen, "You all claim that Yuwen Rong is evil, and I have removed him. Now, what should we do if there is not enough money in the treasury? What are you here for?" Pei and the other officials were fearful and unable to answer, but Emperor Xuanzong did not punish them. Pei was also made the chief imperial censor (御史大夫, Yushi Daifu) on 18 September. On 11 October, he was moved from the legislative bureau to serve as Huangmen Shilang (黃門侍郎), the deputy of the examination bureau (門下省, Menxia Sheng), and continued to serve as chancellor.

On 28 January 730, Pei was made Palace Attendant, the head of the Chancellary and a post accorded default chancellor rank. A few months later on 2 May, he was also given the additional post as the minister of civil service affairs (吏部尚書, Libu Shangshu), in charge of selecting officials. Prior to Pei's serving as minister of civil service affairs, Tang civil service selections were said to be focused on a person's abilities. Pei changed the system that seniority became the most important factor, such that unless someone was shown to have committed an offense, no one with less seniority could leap over him. It was said that the mediocre officials who had been stuck at low positions were happy about Pei's changes and called his proposal, "the holy proposal," but those with abilities were angry at the change. Despite strenuous objections by the senior advisor Song Jing, Emperor Xuanzong adopted Pei's proposal. Pei was also made an imperial scholar at Hongwen Pavilion (弘文館). He thereafter submitted two works Yaoshan Wangze (瑤山往則) and Weicheng Qiangui (維城前軌) as advice to Emperor Xuanzong. Emperor Xuanzong praised the works and awarded him with silk. However, when Pei proposed a more ambitious work—a series of biographies in the tradition of the Zuo Zhuan, to be written by a team of scholars selected by him, including Li Rong (李融), Zhang Qi (張琪), and Sima Libin (司馬利賓), the project did not make progress and was eventually abandoned.

In 732, Pei attended Emperor Xuanzong's sacrifices to earth, and was given the honorific title of Guanglu Daifu (光祿大夫) and created the Baron of Zhengping. He died in March 733. After his death, there was a dispute over his posthumous name. The scholar at the ministry of worship in charge of choosing posthumous names, Sun Wan (孫琬) criticized Pei's seniority system and recommended the posthumous name of Ke (克, meaning "lenient") -- a posthumous name that was only moderately honoring. Pei's son Pei Zhen (裴稹) submitted a petition arguing for a more honorable posthumous name, and Emperor Xuanzong, overriding Sun's recommendation, chose Zhongxian (忠獻, meaning "faithful and wise"), and had Zhang Jiuling write the epitaph.

== Notes and references ==
- Old Book of Tang, vol. 84.
- New Book of Tang, vol. 108.
- Zizhi Tongjian, vols. vol. 212, 213.
