= Li Yuanhong (Tang chancellor) =

Chinese chancellor of the Tang dynasty

Li Yuanhong (Chinese: 李元紘; pinyin: Lǐ Yuánhóng; died 733), courtesy name Dagang (大綱), formally Baron Wenzhong of Qingshui (清水文忠男), was a Chinese politician during the Tang dynasty, serving as a chancellor during the reign of Emperor Xuanzong.

== Background ==
It is not known when Li Yuanhong was born. His family was originally from what would become Hua Prefecture (滑州, roughly modern Anyang, Henan), but by Li Yuanhong's time had moved to the Tang dynasty capital Chang'an. The family claimed to be descended from the Han dynasty general Li Ling, who had surrendered to Xiongnu after being surrounded. According to their claims, an ancestor of theirs and descendant of Li Ling eventually became a subject of Northern Wei and, as he met the Northern Wei emperor at Bing Hall (丙殿), was given the family name of Bing. Li Yuanhong's great-great-grandfather Bing Ming (丙明) served as a commandant during the Sui dynasty and was created the Duke of Longju. Li Yuanhong's great-grandfather Bing Can (丙粲) later became a subject of the Tang dynasty, as he was an acquaintance of Tang's founder Emperor Gaozu; Emperor Gaozu created him the Duke of Ying. In order to observe naming taboo for Emperor Gaozu's father Li Bing (李昺), Emperor Gaozu had the Bing family's name changed to Li. Li Yuanhong's grandfather Li Kuan (李寬) served as the minister of worship during the reign of Emperor Gaozu's grandson Emperor Gaozong, and carried the title of Duke of Longxi. Li Yuanhong's father Li Daoguang served as a chancellor during the reign of Emperor Gaozong's wife Wu Zetian.

Li Yuanhong was said to be careful and kind in his youth. He started his civil service career as a military office at Jing Prefecture (涇州, roughly modern Pingliang, Gansu), and later was promoted to be the census officer at the capital prefecture Yong Prefecture (雍州, roughly modern Xi'an, Shaanxi) during the second reign of Wu Zetian's son Emperor Zhongzong. At that time, Emperor Zhongzong's sister Princess Taiping was one of the powerful women at court, and on one occasion, she was litigating with a Buddhist temple as to the ownership of a mill, Li Yuanhong ruled for the temple. Li Yuanhong's superior, the secretary general of Yong Prefecture Dou Huaizhen, was shocked and tried to get Li to change his ruling; Li responded by writing, in large characters, under his ruling, "The Southern Mountains [(i.e., the Qinling Mountains)] may move before this ruling may be changed." Dou could not do anything about it. Li later served as the magistrate of Haozhi County (好畤, in modern Xianyang, Shaanxi) and then the military advisor to the prefect of Run Prefecture (潤州, roughly modern Zhenjiang, Jiangsu), and was said to have good reputation wherever he served.

== During Emperor Xuanzong's reign ==
Early in the Kaiyuan era (713–741) of Emperor Zhongzong's nephew Emperor Xuanzong, Li Yuanhong became the magistrate of Wannian County (萬年), one of the two counties making up the capital Chang'an. It was said that he was fair in imposing taxes and that he was able to get the county well-governed without being overly strict. He was later promoted to the mayor of Jingzhao Municipality (京兆府, i.e., Chang'an). It was said at the time that powerful clans often constructed private mills on the rivers in Chang'an, and this negatively impacted the irrigation. Li ordered that these private mills be destroyed, at great benefit to the people. He later successively served as the deputy minister of public works (工部侍郎, Gongbu Shilang), defense (兵部侍郎, Bingbu Shilang), and civil service affairs (吏部侍郎, Libu Shilang).

In 725, the deputy ministers of census (戶部侍郎, Hubu Shilang) Yang Chang (楊瑒) and Bai Zhishen (白知慎) were both charged with making poor budgetary decisions and demoted to be prefectural prefects. Emperor Xuanzong asked the chancellors and other officials to recommend someone who could be qualified to lead the ministry of census, and many recommended Li. Emperor Xuanzong was set to make him the minister of census (戶部尚書, Hubu Shangshu), but the high level officials at the time thought that he was still too inexperienced, and therefore he was only made deputy minister of census, and was given the honorific title Zhong Daifu (中大夫). He submitted a number of policy suggestions that pleased Emperor Xuanzong, and Emperor Xuanzong awarded him with a robe and silk. In 726, in the aftermaths of the chancellor Zhang Shuo being removed on accusations of corruption, Li was made Zhongshu Shilang (中書侍郎), the deputy head of the legislative bureau of government (中書省, Zhongshu Sheng) and given the designation Tong Zhongshu Menxia Pingzhangshi (同中書門下平章事), making him a chancellor de facto. He was also given the honorific title Yinqing Guanglu Daifu (銀青光祿大夫) and created the Baron of Qingshui.

It was said that Li was honest and frugal, and after he became chancellor, he, with some success, tried to curb the tendency for officials to seek promotions by bribes or ingratiations. There was a proposal at the time to end the system of using certain public fields' produce as salary for the officials and instead using the fields to produce for the treasury; Li pointed out that doing so would be merely causing an additional layer of waste, as ultimately the officials' salaries would have to come from the treasury, and the proposal was not carried out. Meanwhile, the official Wu Jing (吳兢) had been in charge of editing the imperial history, but before his work was complete, he took a leave because of his mother's death. After Wu's period of mourning was complete, he requested to continue the work and was permitted to do so at the Jixian Institute (集賢院). After Zhang retired in 727, Emperor Xuanzong also had him work on editing the imperial history at home. Li believed that having Wu and Zhang work separately in separate locations, rather than at the History Pavilion (史館, Shiguan) that Emperor Xuanzong's great-grandfather Emperor Taizong had established, made it easy for imperial archives to be lost, and at his suggestion, Wu and Zhang were asked to work together at the History Pavilion.

It was said that while Li served as chancellor, he did not get a larger mansion, did not get more impressive horses, and gave the imperial awards to his relatives, drawing praise from the senior official Song Jing. However, he often had disagreements with fellow chancellor Du Xian, and the senior chancellor Yuan Qianyao was unable to moderate their differences, drawing Emperor Xuanzong's displeasure with all three. In 729, he removed all three from chancellor positions, replacing them with Yuwen Rong and Pei Guangting, while retaining fellow chancellor Xiao Song. Li was demoted to be the prefect of Cao Prefecture (曹州, roughly modern Heze, Shandong). He later left civil service altogether on account of illness, but later was given the honorary office of minister of census and allowed to retire with that title. In 733, when he was seriously ill, he was made the head of the household for Emperor Xuanzong's crown prince Li Hong. He died soon thereafter and was given posthumous honors.

== Notes and references ==
- Old Book of Tang, vol. 98.
- New Book of Tang, vol. 126.
- Zizhi Tongjian, vols. 208, 213.
