= Yuan Qianyao =

Chinese politician during the Tang dynasty

Yuan Qianyao (源乾曜; died December 22, 731), formally the Duke of Anyang (安陽公), was a Chinese politician during the Tang dynasty, twice serving as chancellor during the reign of Emperor Xuanzong.

== Background ==
Yuan Qianyao was from Xiang Prefecture (相州, in modern Handan, Hebei). His family traced its ancestry to the Northern Wei official Yuan He, who was a prince of the Xianbei state Southern Liang. His ancestors later served as officials of Northern Zhou and Sui dynasty. Yuan Qianyao's grandfather Yuan Shimin (源師民) served as deputy minister of justice during Sui, while his father Yuan Zhixin (源直心) served as the minister of justice under Emperor Gaozong of Tang, but was, for offenses lost to history, exiled to the Lingnan region and died there. Yuan Qianyao passed the imperial examinations, although it is not known when that occurred.

== During Emperor Zhongzong's and Emperor Ruizong's second reigns ==
During the second reign of Emperor Gaozong's son Emperor Zhongzong (who reigned twice and whose second reign was from 705 to 710), Yuan Qianyao served as Dianzhong Shi Yushi (殿中侍御史), a low-level imperial censor, and his responsibility was to examine the matters of the Jiangdong region (江東, i.e., modern southern Jiangsu and northern Zhejiang, south of the Yangtze River). He was considered capable in his duties, and was eventually promoted to the higher office of Jianyi Daifu (諫議大夫). After Emperor Zhongzong's brother Li Dan the Prince of Xiang, himself a former emperor, took the throne again (as Emperor Ruizong) in 710, there was an occasion when it was proposed that the shooting ceremony—a traditional ceremony in which the emperor led the officials in firing arrows from bows—be abolished. Yuan opposed the abolition, arguing that it was a traditional ceremony required by Confucian regulations. It is not known whether his opposition was well received by Emperor Ruizong, although it was said that he was soon made the commandant at Liang Prefecture (梁州, roughly modern Hanzhong, Shaanxi).

== During Emperor Xuanzong's reign ==
In 712, Emperor Ruizong yielded the throne to his son and crown prince, Li Longji, who took the throne as Emperor Xuanzong. Early in Emperor Xuanzong's Kaiyuan era (713-741), a number of staff members of Emperor Xuanzong's cousin Li Shouli the Prince of Bin committed offenses. Emperor Xuanzong wanted a secretary general for Li Shouli who could lead by example, and Emperor Xuanzong's close associate, the minister of ceremonies Jiang Jiao (姜皎), recommended Yuan Qianyao. Emperor Xuanzong summoned Yuan for a meeting, and at the meeting, Yuan impressed Emperor Xuanzong with his energy and ability to answer difficult questions. He thus made Yuan secretary general for Li Shouli, as well as the deputy minister of palace supplies (少府少監, Shaofu Shaojian). He soon promoted Yuan to be deputy minister of census (戶部侍郎, Hubu Shilang) and deputy chief censor (御史中丞, Yushi Zhongcheng). Eventually, he was promoted to be Shangshu Zuo Cheng (尚書左丞), one of the secretaries general for the executive bureau of government (尚書省, Shangshu Sheng).

In winter 716, Emperor Xuanzong promoted Yuan to be Huangmen Shilang (黃門侍郎), the deputy head of the examination bureau (黃門省, Huangmen Sheng), and gave him the designation Tong Ziwei Huangmen Sanpin (同紫微黃門三品), making him a chancellor de facto. However, Emperor Xuanzong still entrusted more responsibilities to the more senior chancellor Yao Chong, despite Yao's suffering from malaria at the time. As Yao did not have a mansion in the capital Chang'an, he was staying at Wangji Temple (罔極寺), and Emperor Xuanzong often had Yuan consult Yao at Wangji Temple. It was said that when Yuan made suggestions to Emperor Xuanzong that satisfied Emperor Xuanzong, Emperor Xuanzong would state, "This must be the will of Yao Chong," and that whenever Yuan made suggestions that Emperor Xuanzong was dissatisfied about, Emperor Xuanzong would state, "Go consult with Yao Chong first." However, Yao himself would soon draw the displeasure from Emperor Xuanzong due to allegations that his sons and associate Zhao Hui (趙誨) were corrupt. Yao thus offered to resign and recommended Song Jing to succeed him. Just two months after Yuan was made chancellor, both he and Yao were removed from their chancellor positions, to be replaced by Song and Su Ting. With Emperor Xuanzong then at the eastern capital Luoyang, Emperor Xuanzong made Yuan the mayor of Chang'an, to be in charge of the city in his absence. Yao served as the mayor of Chang'an for three years and governed the capital capably. On one occasion, when Emperor Xuanzong lost his white eagle while hunting, he sent out an order that the eagle be recaptured. When Yuan's subordinates located the eagle, the eagle was dead and stuck to thorns—leading Yuan's subordinates to be fearful of imperial wrath. However, Yuan explained to them that the emperor would not punish them for fortuity of the eagle's death, and then personally submitted a petition in which he claimed that he erred and should be punished. As he predicted, Emperor Xuanzong did not take offense and did not punish him or his subordinates.

In 720, Yuan was again made Huangmen Shilang and chancellor de facto, along with Zhang Jiazhen, replacing Song and Su. He was soon made Shizhong (侍中), the head of the examination bureau and a post considered one for a chancellor. He submitted a petition pointing out that at that time, the powerful officials' sons and brothers were generally given posts in the capital region, thus forcing junior officials without such connections to take positions far from the capital. He suggested that those powerful officials' sons and brothers be sent out of the capital—offering to have two of his three sons, all of whom were serving in the capital region at the time, be sent out. Emperor Xuanzong issued an edict praising him and implementing his suggestion—that no family of officials is allowed to have three members all serving in the capital region.

In 722, under suggestions that the chancellors should be given an adequate supply of revenue so that they could concentrate on state matters, Emperor Xuanzong ordered that each chancellor be given tax revenues from 300 households, and Yuan and Zhang became the first chancellors to benefit from the order.

In 725, under the suggestion of Zhang Shuo, who had become chancellor by that point, Emperor Xuanzong prepared to offer sacrifices to heaven and earth at Mount Tai—a suggestion that Yuan disagreed with, and it was said that Yuan and Zhang began to have discord from that point on. After Emperor Xuanzong offered sacrifices at Mount Tai in 726, Yuan was given the additional office of Zuo Chengxiang (左丞相) -- one of the heads of the executive bureau—but also remained Shizhong. Later in 726, after Zhang Shuo was accused of corruption, Yuan was one of the officials that Emperor Xuanzong put in charge of interrogating Zhang, although subsequently Zhang was largely spared, stripped only of his chancellor status.

It was said that throughout the time that Yuan served as chancellor with Zhang Jiazhen and Zhang Shuo, he largely acted carefully and simply deferred to them on important matters—and he was much criticized when, at Zhang Jiazhen's suggestion, Jiang was exiled in 722, and he failed to try to intercede on Jiang's behalf, despite Jiang's having recommended him years before. By 729, when he was serving with Li Yuanhong and Du Xian, Li and Du often disagreed with each other, and Yuan was not doing anything to moderate them. This drew Emperor Xuanzong's displeasure with all three and, in summer 729, he removed all three from chancellor posts, replacing them with Yuwen Rong and Pei Guangting, while retaining fellow chancellor Xiao Song. Yuan kept his position as Zuo Chengxiang and continued to serve in that office briefly. In fall 729, he was made an advisor to Li Hong the Crown Prince, with the title Taizi Shaoshi (太子少師) -- but declined on the basis that his grandfather Yuan Shimin had the character "Shi" in his name, and therefore he could not accept the office due to naming taboo. In response, Emperor Xuanzong renamed the office Taizi Shaofu (太子少傅) to allow Yuan to be able to serve. The day that Yuan was to take office, Song and Zhang Shuo were to take new offices as well, Emperor Xuanzong set up a grand ceremony for their inauguration, including an elaborate tent, music, and food from the imperial kitchen. Emperor Xuanzong personally wrote a poem commemorating the contributions of the three. He also created Yuan the Duke of Anyang.

In 731, Emperor Xuanzong was set to visit Luoyang again. Yuan was said to be old and ill at the time, and was unable to accompany Emperor Xuanzong, and he remained at Chang'an. He died winter that year, and was buried with honor.

== Sons ==
- Yuan Fu (源復), prefect of Hua (華州)
- Yuan Bi (源弼), Gongbu Langzhong (工部郎中), a supervisory official at the ministry of public works
- Yuan Jie (源潔), county magistrate of Henan (one of the two counties making up Luoyang)
- Yuan Qing (源清), married Princess Zhenyang (真陽公主) daughter of Xuanzong

== Notes and references ==
- Old Book of Tang, vol. 98.
- New Book of Tang, vol. 127.
- Zizhi Tongjian, vols. 208, 211, 212, 213.
