= Du Xian (Tang dynasty) =

Chinese military general and politician

Du Xian (Chinese: 杜暹; died 740), formally Marquess Zhenxiao of Wei County (魏縣貞孝侯), was a Chinese military general and politician during the Tang dynasty, serving as chancellor during the reign of Emperor Xuanzong.

== Background ==
It is not known when Du Xian was born. His family was from Pu Prefecture (濮州, roughly modern Heze, Shandong) and claimed its ancestry from the Qin dynasty general Du He (杜赫), and traced itself to a line of officials during the Northern Wei, Northern Qi, Sui dynasty, and Tang dynasty. It was said that the clan's members were on such good terms that it did not divide for five generations down to Du Xian. Both Du Xian's grandfather Du Yikuan (杜義寬) and father Du Chengzhi (杜承志) were low level officials.

Du Zhicheng died early in the reign of Wu Zetian. Du Xian, in his youth at that time, was said to be respectful and careful, and was particularly filially pious toward his stepmother and caring toward his half-brother Du Yu (杜昱). After he passed the imperial examinations, he became a military officer at Wu Prefecture (婺州, roughly modern Jinhua, Zhejiang). When his term of office was complete, his subordinates, as a farewell gift, gave him 10,000 sheets of paper—then a highly valuable commodity. He only accepted 100 and returned the rest. The witnesses commented, "In the past, there had been honest officials who only received gifts of a single large coin. This is similar." He later served as the sheriff of Zheng County (鄭縣, in modern Weinan, Shaanxi), and was again known for his honesty. At that time, the official Yang Fu (楊孚) was serving as the military advisor to the prefect of Hua Prefecture (華州, roughly modern Weinan), which Zheng County belonged to, and was impressed with Du. Later, while Yang was serving as a judge at the supreme court (大理寺, Dali Si), Du was accused of an offense. Yang commented, "If even this sheriff could be accused of a crime, how can we encourage officials to be clean and honest?" He informed this to his superiors and had Du made a Dali Pingshi (大理評事) -- a judicial clerk.

== During Emperor Xuanzong's reign ==
In 716, during the reign of Emperor Xuanzong, Du Xian was made Jiancha Yushi (監察御史), an imperial censor. On one occasion, there was a dispute between the deputy Protectorate General to Pacify the West Guo Qian'guan (郭虔瓘), the general Liu Xiaqing (劉遐慶), and the Tang vassal Western Tujue's khan Ashina Xian. Emperor Xuanzong sent Du to the region to investigate the dispute. As part of his investigation, he visited the Tuqishi (突騎施) tribe. A Tuqishi chieftain gave him gold as a gift. Du initially declined, but his subordinates pointed out that rejecting the gift might be viewed as an insult, so Du accepted it—and then buried it below the tent. After he left Tuqishi, he then sent messengers to the chieftain to inform him where the gold was buried. This impressed the Tuqishi chieftain.

Du later served as imperial attendant (給事中, Jishizhong), but later left civil service to observe a mourning period when his stepmother died. In 724, then-Protectorate General to Pacify the West, Zhang Xiaosong (張孝嵩), was made the mayor of Taiyuan Municipality, and he recommended Du to replace him. Emperor Xuanzong recalled Du, while he was still in the mourning period, to serve as the deputy protectorate general, acting as the protectorate general. In 725, when the vassal king of Yutian, Yuchi Tiao (尉遲晀), was plotting with the local tribes to rebel against Tang. When Du found out, he attacked Yuchi Tiao, killed him, and placed a new king of Yutian on the throne. He was given the honorific title of Guanglu Daifu (光祿大夫). It was said that during Du's service as protectorate general, he cared greatly for the soldiers under him and worked hard, earning the love of both the Han Chinese and the non-Han.

In fall 726, for his accomplishments, Du was recalled to the capital Chang'an, and, while he continued to be titularly protectorate general, remained at Chang'an to serve as chancellor with the designation Tong Zhongshu Menxia Pingzhangshi (同中書門下平章事). However, he was also responsible for an incident that damaged the relationship with Tuqishi—as the khan of Tuqishi, Sulu (蘇祿), had married the daughter of a prior Western Tujue khan, Ashina Huaidao, and Emperor Xuanzong created her the Princess Jiaohe. When Princess Jiaohe sent messengers and 1,000 horses to Du's headquarters to sell horses, the messengers read of an order from her, as princess—and Du responded by angrily stating, "How dare an Ashina woman issue me an order?" He caned the messengers and detained the horses, which largely died in a few subsequent snowstorms. In late 726, after Du left his office, Sulu attacked, causing much damage, and Sulu withdrew only after he heard that Du had been made chancellor.

By 729, Du was having repeated disagreements with fellow chancellor Li Yuanhong, and the senior chancellor Yuan Qianyao was unable to moderate them. This drew Emperor Xuanzong's displeasure with them, and he removed all three of them, replacing them with Yuwen Rong and Pei Guangting, while retaining fellow chancellor Xiao Song. Du was demoted to be the secretary general at Jing Prefecture (荊州, roughly modern Jingzhou, Hubei). He later successively served as prefect of Wei Prefecture (魏州, in modern Handan, Hebei) and mayor of Taiyuan Municipality.

In 732, when Emperor Xuanzong visited Taiyuan, he made Du the minister of census (戶部尚書, Hubu Shangshu), and had Du accompany him back to Chang'an. Subsequently, when Emperor Xuanzong visited Luoyang, Du was left in charge of Chang'an. In Emperor Xuanzong's absence, Du conscripted soldiers to repair the three main palaces and the city walls, personally attending to the projects without rest. Emperor Xuanzong issued an edict thanking him for his diligence. Later, Du was made the minister of rites (禮部尚書, Libu Shangshu) and created the Marquess of Wei County.

It was said that Du was honest but without sufficient knowledge, and often spoke in vulgar terms. Ever since his youth, he made a vow not to accept gifts, and when Du died in 740, he was given posthumous honors, but while his son Du Xiaoyou (杜孝友) accepted the imperial bestowments, he declined all gifts from Du's colleagues and subordinates. There was a dispute over his posthumous name, as the ministry of worship initially suggested Zhensu (貞肅, meaning "faithful and stern"), while the officials Liu Tongsheng (劉同升) and Wei Lian (韋廉) believed that Du was both faithful to the state and filially pious and should be given a greater posthumous name signifying both virtues. The imperial scholar Pei Zong (裴總) believed that that was inappropriate, pointing out that Du came out of the period of mourning to take an office and thus, in Pei's opinion, could not be considered sufficiently filially pious. After Du Xiaoyou submitted a petition to Emperor Xuanzong, Emperor Xuanzong had the matter reexamined, and eventually, Du Xian was given the posthumous name of Zhenxiao (貞孝, meaning "faithful and filial").

== Notes and references ==
- Old Book of Tang, vol. 98.
- New Book of Tang, vol. 126.
- Zizhi Tongjian, vols. 212, 213.
