= Yao Chong =

Chinese chancellor

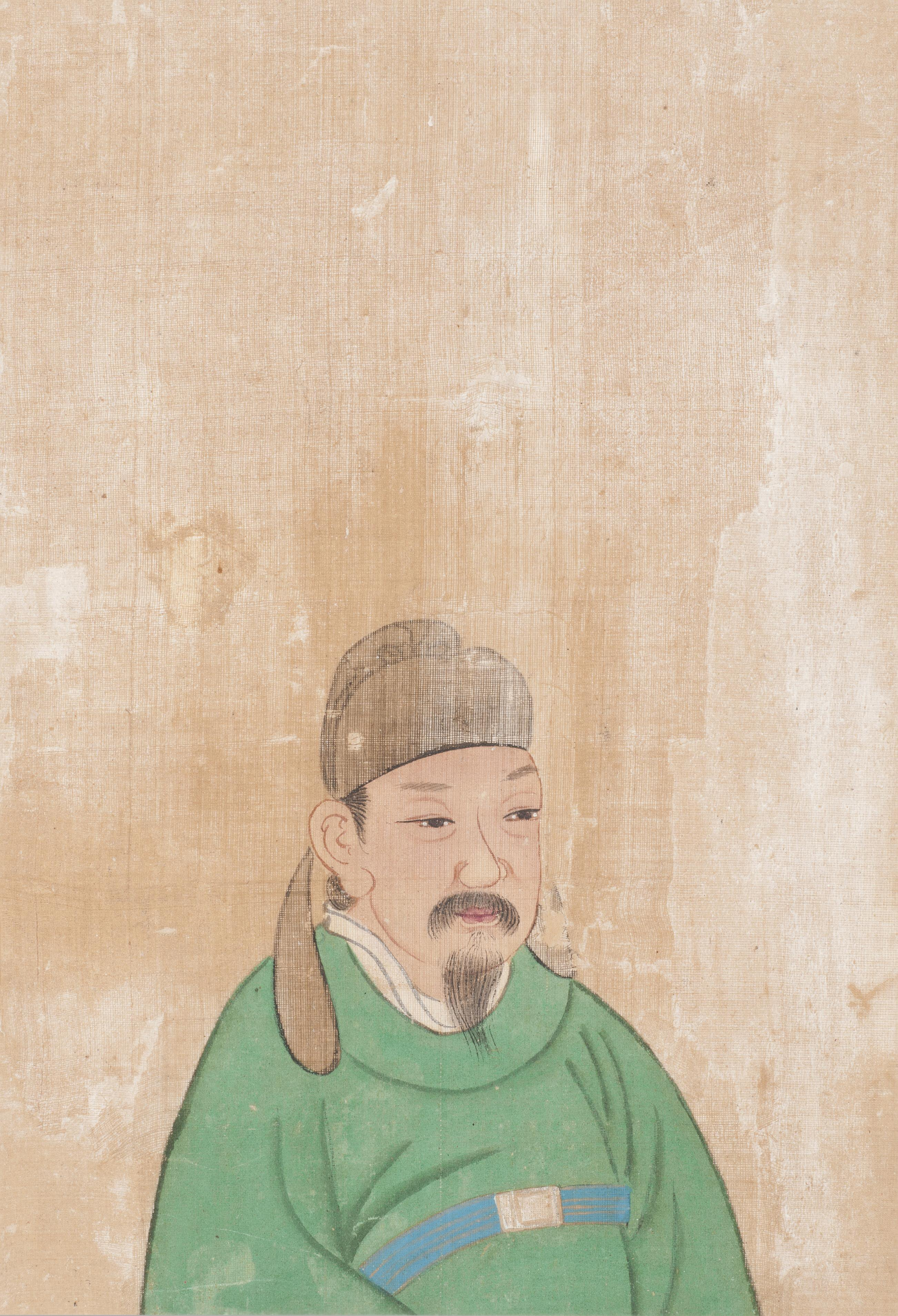
As depicted in the album Portraits of Famous Men c. 1900, housed in the Philadelphia Museum of Art

Yao Chong (Chinese: 姚崇; pinyin: Yáo Chóng; 650 – September 28, 721), born Yao Yuanchong (姚元崇), known 700s–713 by the courtesy name Yuanzhi (元之), posthumous name Duke Wenxian of Liang (梁文獻公), was an official of the China's Tang and Wu Zhou dynasties, serving as chancellor under four sovereigns—Wu Zetian, her sons Emperor Zhongzong and Emperor Ruizong, and her grandson Emperor Xuanzong. After his resignation in 716, he still had great influence inside the imperial government, and his opinions often influenced the decisions of Emperor Xuanzong and the succeeding chancellors.

== Family ==
- Consorts and issues:
  - Lady Wang, of the Wang clan (女王氏)
  - Furen, of the Zheng clan (夫人鄭氏)
  - Furen, of the Liu clan (夫人劉氏)
    - Yao Yi (姚彝; 677- 16 September 716), first son
    - Yao Yi (姚异), second son
  - Unknown:
    - Yao Yi (姚弈), third son
    - Lady Yao (姚氏), of the Yao clan

== Background ==
Yao Chong was born in 650, during the reign of Emperor Gaozong. His father Yao Shanyi (姚善意) served Emperor Gaozong's father Emperor Taizong as the commandant at Xi Prefecture (巂州, roughly modern Liangshan Yi Autonomous Prefecture, Sichuan).

Yao Chong himself started his civil service career serving as an attendant to Emperor Gaozong's son and crown prince Li Hong, and was known for being able to write quickly. He later served as the food supply officer at Pu Prefecture (濮州, roughly modern Heze, Shandong). He was then moved in his office five times and eventually became Xiaguan Langzhong (夏官郎中), a low-level official at the ministry of defense.

== During Wu Zetian's reign ==
During the Khitan invasion of 696–697, Yao Chong was serving at the ministry of defense, when there was much emergency paperwork due to the Khitan invasion. Yao conducted the official business with efficiency and gave much useful comments when he processed the paperwork. This impressed Emperor Gaozong's wife Wu Zetian, then "emperor" (the only woman with that title in Chinese history) of her Zhou dynasty, and she gave him an unusually steep promotion to be the deputy minister of defense (夏官侍郎, Xiaguan Shilang).

In 697, after Wu Zetian's secret police official Lai Junchen, who had been responsible for falsely implicating many officials in treason accusations and executing them, was himself executed, Wu Zetian made a comment that after Lai's death, she had not heard of any accusations of treason. Yao pointed out that Lai, along with other secret police officials, had been making false accusations, and that he believed that in the future there would not be any treason accusations at all. Pleased with Yao's comment, she awarded him money.

In 698, Wu Zetian gave Yao the designation Tong Fengge Luantai Pingzhangshi (同鳳閣鸞臺平章事), making him a chancellor de facto, probably at the recommendation of the senior chancellor Di Renjie.

In 702, Wu Zetian considered launching a campaign against Eastern Tujue, and she put her son Li Dan the Prince of Xiang in command of the army, assisted by her family members Wu Sansi the Prince of Liang, Wu Youning the Prince of Jianchang, and the chancellor Wei Yuanzhong. Yao Yuanchong was to serve as secretary general for Li Dan on this campaign, but eventually the campaign was not launched. Around this time, there was an ethnic Tujue chieftain named Zhali Yuanchong (吒利元崇) who rebelled against Zhou. Wu Zetian did not want Yao to share a name with Zhali, and therefore had him use his courtesy name of Yuanzhi.

In 704, Yao, who was by that point Fengge Shilang (鳳閣侍郎), the deputy head of the legislative bureau of government (鳳閣, Fengge), citing the fact that his mother was old, requested to be relieved of his office so that he could attend to his mother. In summer 704, Wu Zetian made him Li Dan's secretary general, but allowed him to have the salary and prestige as officials of the third rank (i.e., chancellors—while the secretary general for an imperial prince was only ordinarily fourth rank, second division, first class). Less than a month later, she made him also the minister of defense (夏官尚書, Xiaguan Shangshu) and chancellor de facto again, with the greater designation of Tong Fengge Luantai Sanpin (同鳳閣鸞臺三品). However, he declined the post of minister of defense, explaining that while he was serving Li Dan, for him to be in command of the army would hurt Li Dan (i.e., possibly bring suspicions on Li Dan). Therefore, Wu Zetian instead made him the minister of rites (春官尚書, Chunguan Shangshu). Around this time, Wu Zetian's lover Zhang Yizhi wanted to move 10 senior Buddhist monks from the capital Luoyang to a temple that he had built in Ding Prefecture (定州, roughly modern Baoding, Hebei). These monks did not wish to go and petitioned Yao, who ruled that the monks did not have to go, despite repeated requests by Zhang. Zhang therefore spoke to Wu Zetian against Yao, and Yao was demoted to be the minister of husbandry (司僕卿, Sipu Qing), although he remained chancellor. Soon, Wu Zetian, while letting Yao remain chancellor, made him the commanding general of the army at Lingwu, apparently again contemplating a campaign against Eastern Tujue. Before Yao departed for Lingwu, Wu Zetian met him personally and asked him to recommend someone who is suitable for being chancellor, and Yao recommended Zhang Jianzhi. She then made Zhang Jianzhi chancellor.

In spring 705, while Yao was still away from Luoyang, Wu Zetian was ill, and the affairs of state were largely decided by Zhang Yizhi and his brother Zhang Changzong, also Wu Zetian's lover, and there were rumors that Zhang Yizhi and Zhang Changzong were planning on formally seizing power. Zhang Jianzhi, distressed over the situation, entered into a plot with other officials Cui Xuanwei, Jing Hui, Huan Yanfan, and Yuan Shuji, as well as the generals Li Duozuo and Li Dan (李湛, note different character than the Prince of Xiang), to carry out a coup. Once Yao returned from Lingwu, Zhang Jianzhi and Huan discussed the plot with him, and he joined the plot. Soon, the coup was carried out, and Zhang Yizhi and Zhang Changzong were killed. Wu Zetian, while still carrying the title of emperor, was forced to yield the throne to her son Li Xian the Crown Prince (formerly emperor), and Li Xian was restored to the throne as Emperor Zhongzong. For his participation in the coup, Yao was created the Marquess of Liang.

== During Emperor Zhongzong's second reign ==
Soon, Wu Zetian was moved from the main palace to the secondary palace Shangyang Palace (上陽宮), under heavy guard, although Emperor Zhongzong still honored her with the title of Emperor Zetiandasheng (則天大聖皇帝, from which "Wu Zetian," by which she was later known, was derived). When she was moved, most officials celebrated, but Yao Yuanzhi wept bitterly. Huan Yanfan and Zhang Jianzhi told him, "This is no time for you to cry. It may be that today is the start of a disaster for you." Yao responded:

I have long served Emperor Zetian. When I see her being transported away, I suffer in distress. Earlier, when I followed you to kill the treacherous and the treasonous [(i.e., Zhang Yizhi and Zhang Changzong)], it was out of my obligations as a subject. Today, as I send off my former sovereign, I am also doing so out of my obligations as a subject. I am willing to be punished for this, if this is viewed as a crime.

Huan and Zhang Jianzhi thereafter demoted Yao to be the prefect of Bo Prefecture (亳州, roughly modern Bozhou, Anhui). Perhaps because of this, he survived the subsequent reprisal that Emperor Zhongzong later carried out at the suggestion of his cousin Wu Sansi (Wu Zetian's nephew) against the coup leaders in 706, and he later was made the prefect of Chang Prefecture (常州, roughly modern Changzhou, Jiangsu), then Yue Prefecture (越州, roughly modern Shaoxing, Zhejiang), then Xu Prefecture (許州, roughly modern Xuchang, Henan).

== During Emperor Ruizong's second reign ==
In 710, Emperor Zhongzong died suddenly—a death that traditional historians believed to be a poisoning carried out by his wife Empress Wei and daughter Li Guo'er the Princess Anle so that Empress Wei, like Wu Zetian, could become "emperor" and Li Guo'er could become crown princess. For the time, however, Emperor Zhongzong's son by a concubine, Li Chongmao the Prince of Wen, became emperor (as Emperor Shang), with Empress Wei as empress dowager and regent. Less than a month later, a coup led by Emperor Zhongzong's sister Princess Taiping and Li Dan's son Li Longji the Prince of LInzi killed Empress Wei and Li Guo'er. Emperor Shang was deposed, and Li Dan, himself a former emperor, became emperor again (as Emperor Ruizong). Emperor Ruizong recalled Yao Yuanzhi, then serving as the prefect of Xu Prefecture, to the central government to serve as the minister of defense (now with the changed title of Bingbu Shangshu (兵部尚書)) and gave him the chancellor designation of Tong Zhongshu Menxia Sanpin (同中書門下三品). He and another chancellor, Song Jing, were said to be concentrating on ending the problematic policies of Emperor Zhongzong's reign, including reforming the civil service system and removing officials who had improperly received offices by bribing powerful people at court. In particular, one abuse he and Song sought to reverse was how Emperor Zhongzong had commissioned several thousands of officials without review by the examination bureau (門下省, Menxia Sheng), which was in charge of reviewing imperial edicts, and at their requests, Emperor Ruizong removed these officials from their offices. (Because Emperor Zhongzong signified that a review by the examination bureau was not necessary by sealing the envelopes containing the commissions in a slanted manner, these officials were known as the "slanted-sealed officials" (斜封官).) Later that year, Yao was made Zhongshu Ling (中書令) – the head of the legislative bureau (now named Zhongshu Sheng (中書省)) and a post considered one for a chancellor.

Meanwhile, Li Longji, while he was not Emperor Ruizong's oldest son or born of his wife, the deceased Empress Liu, was made crown prince after Emperor Ruizong's return to the throne because of his accomplishment in the coup against Empress Wei. He soon frequently clashed with his aunt Princess Taiping, however, on matters of politics, and Princess Taiping tried to spread the sentiment that Li Longji should not be crown prince, and that his older brother Li Chengqi the Prince of Song, who was born of Empress Liu, or his cousin Li Shouli the Prince of Yong (the son of Emperor Ruizong's older brother Li Xian (note different character than Emperor Zhongzong)) should be crown prince. In 711, Song and Yao, trying to end to political uncertainty, suggested sending Li Chengqi and Li Shouli out of the capital Chang'an to serve as prefectural prefects, while sending Princess Taiping and her husband Wu Youji (Wu Zetian's nephew) to settle in the eastern capital Luoyang. Emperor Ruizong accepted the suggestion except as to Princess Taiping's place of settlement (sending her to the closer Pu Prefecture (蒲州, roughly modern Yuncheng, Shanxi) rather than Luoyang). When Princess Taiping found out, however, she complained bitterly to Li Longji, and Li Longji, in fear, publicly requested that the orders be rescinded and that Song and Yao be put to death for alienating him from his aunt, brother, and cousin. In response, Emperor Ruizong cancelled the orders and demoted both Song and Yao to be prefectural prefects—in Yao's case, to be the prefect of Shen Prefecture (申州, roughly modern Xinyang, Henan). He was then moved several times in his office, to be the prefect of Xu Prefecture (徐州, roughly modern Xuzhou, Jiangsu—a different Xu Prefecture than where he had served before) and then Lu Prefecture (潞州, roughly modern Changzhi, Shanxi). He was then made the secretary general at Yang Prefecture (揚州, roughly modern Yangzhou, Jiangsu), and was said to have governed it so well that the people built a monument dedicated to him. Eventually, he became the prefect of Tong Prefecture (同州, roughly modern Weinan, Shaanxi).

== During Emperor Xuanzong's reign ==
In 712, Emperor Ruizong passed the throne to Li Longji (as Emperor Xuanzong), but, at Princess Taiping's suggestion, retained most imperial powers as Taishang Huang (retired emperor). In 713, after Emperor Xuanzong, claiming that Princess Taiping was planning to kill him, carried out a reprisal (先天之变, Xiantian incident) against her, forcing her to commit suicide and executing many of her associates, Emperor Ruizong transferred his authorities to Emperor Xuanzong. In winter 713, Emperor Xuanzong carried out a major review of troops at Xinfeng (新豐, in modern Xi'an, Shaanxi), during which, due to the ceremony not being properly organized as it was supposed to be, he removed and exiled the chancellor Guo Yuanzhen, who was also minister of defense. While at the ceremony, Emperor Xuanzong met a number of prefectural prefects, including Yao Yuanzhi, who personally made 10 suggestions of how he should govern (now known in Chinese as 十事要說), and Emperor Xuanzong considered making Yao chancellor. The chancellor Zhang Yue, jealous of Yao, initially had the imperial censor Zhao Yanzhao submit articles of impeachment against Yao, but when that failed, had the official Jiang Jiao (姜皎), a close associate of Emperor Xuanzong, suggest that Yao should be made the commandant at Hedong (河東, in modern Yuncheng) – which made Emperor Xuanzong suspicious that Zhang was behind the recommendation, and Jiang admitted that that was the case. The next day, Emperor Xuanzong summoned Yao to his presence and made him minister of defense and chancellor with the designation Tong Zhongshu Menxia Sanpin, and created him the Duke of Liang.

It was said that Yao was experienced and quick in his reaction, and that he had great knowledge of military matters. It was also said that he, more than other chancellors, took much effort to take responsibility for important matters, and thus was well-trusted by Emperor Xuanzong, who delegated the matters to him. (However, the biographies of other chancellors and key officials at the time also suggested that Yao was jealous of them and took actions to remove them from power by making false accusations against them—including Zhang, Liu Youqiu, and Zhong Shaojing, accusing Zhang of improper association with Emperor Xuanzong's brother Li Fan (李範) the Prince of Qi and accusing Liu and Zhong of complaining against Emperor Xuanzong for not giving them more important positions.) Around that time, Yao also stopped using the name Yuanzhi—initially changing back to Yuanchong, but then, because Emperor Xuanzong's era name was Kaiyuan, removed "Yuan" from his name and went by the name of Chong. Emperor Xuanzong also made him again the head of the legislative bureau (now with the title Ziwei Ling (紫微令), with the bureau itself renamed Ziwei Sheng (紫微省)).

Around that time, many men took tonsure to be Buddhist monks in order to avoid taxation and labor. In 714, Yao, pointing out that veneration of Buddhist monks did nothing to save Later Zhao, Later Qin, Northern Qi, and Liang dynasty, suggested that Emperor Xuanzong order a thorough review of the ranks of Buddhist monks and nuns and force those who were not truly devout to return to civilian life and be subject to taxation and labors. Some 12,000, as a result, were forced to return to civilian life. Meanwhile, however, when Yao spoke against a campaign that the general and fellow chancellor Xue Na advocated against the Khitan, Emperor Xuanzong did not listen to him and had Xue attack Khitan anyway. (Xue's campaign eventually ended in failure in fall 714.) Yao and his fellow chancellor Lu Huaishen, meanwhile, also did much to try to eliminate the culture of the nobles exerting influence in civil service matters.

By this time, however, Yao was himself nearly caught in a scandal involving his sons' trying to influence the civil service system. Yao's fellow chancellor Wei Zhigu had previously been a subordinate of Yao's who had become progressively promoted to become chancellor with Yao. Yao had once offended Wei because he asked Wei to review the civil service commissions at Luoyang—but then had Song Jing, who was then the minister of civil service affairs, carry out a further review of Wei's actions. Meanwhile, while Wei was at Luoyang, two sons of Yao's, who were officials at Luoyang, because of the relationship that Yao and Wei previously had, accepted bribes from others and tried to influence Wei in his actions. After Wei returned to Chang'an, he reported this to Emperor Xuanzong—who then, on another occasion, tried to discreetly figure out the situation by asking Yao about his sons—and Yao, realizing what must have happened, indicated that it must be the case that his sons improperly tried to influence Wei. Emperor Xuanzong, in turn, became impressed that Yao was willing to admit this and displeased that Wei had tried to remove a former superior, initially wanting to exile Wei. At Yao's insistence that that not happen, he only removed Wei as a chancellor and made him the minister of public works (工部尚書, Gongbu Shangshu).

After Wei's removal (along with Xue's, after the defeat against Khitan), Yao and Lu were the only remaining chancellors, and Yao bore the brunt of the responsibilities. It was said that in 715, when Yao had to take about half a month of vacation due to his son's death, the important affairs stacked up at the legislative bureau, which Lu was unable to handle, and that once Yao returned from vacation, he was able to handle the matters quickly. Lu, realizing that he was not as capable as Yao, usually yielded to Yao in important matters, and the people at the time derogatorily referred to Lu as "the chancellor who simply ate together" (伴食宰相). Also that year, when there was a major locust infestation in central China, Yao advocated capturing and killing the locusts—a strategy that initially yielded no results, and Emperor Xuanzong considered abandoning it. Yao insisted on the strategy, and eventually this led to the improvement of the situation. Lu opined that killing many locusts may lead to disharmony in the spiritual world, but Yao stated that locusts were harming farmers and that he was willing to take any supernatural punishment for killing locusts. Later that year, when Emperor Xuanzong considered eliminating the posts of circuit-reviewing officials (按察使, Ancha Shi), Yao advocated keeping the posts, as he believed that it would be relatively easier to find people suitable to be these officials than to make sure that the prefectural prefects were all suitable officials without Ancha Shi reviewing their acts.

In 716, another locust infestation occurred, and Yao again ordered the capture and killing of locusts. Ni Ruoshui (倪若水), the prefect of Bian Prefecture (汴州, roughly modern Kaifeng, Henan), resisted the orders, claiming that Yao's strategy was carried out by the Han-Zhao emperor Liu Cong and failed miserably, and that only if people in power enhanced their virtues could the locusts be eliminated; Ni went as far as refusing to have imperial censors enter Bian Prefecture to carry out the order. Yao wrote a formal order to Ni, stating:

Liu Chong was a false emperor, and he lacked virtues and thus could not suppress evil. Now, we have a holy emperor, whose virtues are sufficient to suppress evil. In ancient days, if there were virtuous local officials, locusts would not enter their territory. If just enhancing virtues would be sufficient to eliminate locusts, are you admitting that you are without virtues?

Ni thereafter did not dare to resist further.

In winter 716, Lu died, and Yuan Qianyao became chancellor to serve alongside Yao. Around this time, Yao suffered a bout of malaria, and as he did not have a mansion in Chang'an, stayed at Wangji Temple (罔極寺). While Yao was ill, Emperor Xuanzong often sent eunuchs to look after Yao and had Yuan go to Wangji Temple to consult Yao. It was said that when Yuan made suggestions to Emperor Xuanzong that satisfied Emperor Xuanzong, Emperor Xuanzong would state, "This must be the will of Yao Chong," and that whenever Yuan made suggestions that Emperor Xuanzong was dissatisfied about, Emperor Xuanzong would state, "Go consult with Yao Chong first." Around the new year 717, at Yuan's suggestion, Yao was moved from Wangji Temple to the imperial diplomatic pavilion Sifang Pavilion (四方館), where foreign diplomats would stay when they visited Chang'an, allowing Yao to be closer to the palace—a suggestion that Yao initially declined since he did not believe it appropriate for an ill person to stay there, but which he agreed to at Emperor Xuanzong's insistence.

However, at that time, Yao's sons Yao Yí (姚彞) and Yao Yì (姚异) (note different characters and tones), who were both deputy ministers at this time, often received gifts from others, something that the popular opinion at the time criticized them and Yao Chong for. Meanwhile, Yao Chong's associate Zhao Hui (趙誨) was found to have accepted bribes from foreigners, a crime punishable by death but which Yao tried to save him from death for, displeasing Emperor Xuanzong. At that time, Emperor Xuanzong was set to declare a pardon for the criminals of Chang'an, but Emperor Xuanzong modified his pardon to specifically exclude Zhao, ordering that Zhao be caned 100 times and then exiled to the Lingnan region. Yao, in fear, offered to resign and recommended Song to succeed him. Emperor Xuanzong thus removed Yao and Yuan from their chancellor posts—with Yao receiving the honorific title Kaifu Yitong Sansi (開府儀同三司) but no other offices. Song and Su Ting became chancellors to succeed Yao and Yuan. In 717, after Yao made a comment that pleased Emperor Xuanzong, blaming the collapse of a hall of the imperial ancestral temple on the wood being too old rather than on divine displeasure, Yao became restored to Emperor Xuanzong's good graces and, while not made chancellor again, was allowed to meet Emperor Xuanzong once every five days.

Yao died in 721. He wrote a will to his sons that disapproved the possibility of a Buddhist or Taoist funeral, stating:

Buddhism pursues cleanliness and mercy, but many foolish people seek blessings by copying sutras and building buddha statues. In the past, Qi [(i.e., Northern Qi)] and Zhou [(i.e., Northern Zhou)] had the realm divided. Zhou burned the sutras, destroyed the statues, organized its troops, and strived hard to strengthen itself, while Qi built temples and towers everywhere and erected statues, such that the law and governance were all disregarded. When the states battled, Qi was destroyed and Zhou rose. In recent years, the Wus and the Weis built temples and encouraged innumerable people to become monks and nuns, but this did not prevent those two clans from being destroyed. Do not follow those unknowing foolish men and women, burning incense and reciting sutras to beg for supernatural blessings. Taoist monks, seeing the examples of how Buddhist monks preside at funerals and earn moneys, have followed their example and been reciting texts as well. Do not invite them either. This will of mine should be followed by my descendants for generations.

== Notes and references ==
Citations

Sources

- Old Book of Tang, vol. 96.
- New Book of Tang, vol. 124.
- Zizhi Tongjian, vols. 205, 206, 207, 208, 209, 210, 211, 212.
