= Song Jing =

Chinese politician

Song Jing (Chinese: 宋璟; 663 – November 21, 737), posthumous name Duke Wenzhen of Guangping (廣平文貞公), was a Chinese politician of the Tang dynasty and Wu Zhou dynasty, serving as the chancellor during the reigns of Emperor Ruizong and Emperor Xuanzong. He was praised by historians for his insistence on being morally upright, and for being a just administrator of the law during his time as Emperor Xuanzong's senior chancellor.

== Background ==
Song Jing was born in 663, during the reign of Emperor Gaozong. His clan was originally from Guangping (廣平, in modern Handan, Hebei), but by the time of Song Jing's birth, his family had relocated to Xing Prefecture (邢州, roughly modern Xingtai, Hebei). The clan traced its ancestor to the Northern Wei official Song Bian (宋弁), although Song Jing's grandfather Song Wuben (宋務本) and father Song Xuanfu (宋玄撫) served only as local officials. Song Jing was said to be upright in his character from youth. He was also said to be learned and capable in writing, and passed the imperial examinations when he was young.

== During Wu Zetian's reign ==
During the reign of Emperor Gaozong's wife Wu Zetian, Song Jing became Fengge Sheren (鳳閣舍人, Fengge Sheren), a mid-level official at the legislative bureau of government (鳳閣, Fengge). It was said that he acting properly while in office and was respected by Wu Zetian. In 703, when Wu Zetian's lovers Zhang Yizhi and Zhang Changzong tried to falsely accuse the chancellor Wei Yuanzhong by persuading Song's colleague Zhang Shuo to provide corroboration of their accusation that Wei wanted to pledge loyalty to Wu Zetian's son and crown prince Li Xian instead of Wu Zetian herself, it was Song, along with Zhang Tinggui (張廷珪) and Liu Zhiji who persuaded Zhang Shuo that historical reputation was more important than political expediency, which led Zhang Shuo to change his testimony and instead corroborate Wei's innocence. As a result, Wei (and Zhang Shuo) were exiled, but escaped death.

Meanwhile, Song himself refused to yield to Zhang Yizhi and Zhang Changzong, despite their honored status. At one feast, Zhang Yizhi tried to placate Song by offering the most honored position on the table to Song, which Song declined—and subsequently, publicly showed disapproval when another official, Zheng Gao (鄭杲), used an endearing epithet toward Zhang Yizhi. It was said that Zhang Yizhi and Zhang Changzong later tried to attack Song before Wu Zetian, but Wu Zetian favored Song and therefore took no action.

Song soon became Yushi Zhongcheng (御史中丞), one of the deputy chief imperial censors. In 704, when Zhang Changzong was accused of having had inappropriate discussions with the fortuneteller Li Hongtai (李弘泰), who had told him that he had the appearance of an emperor, Song pressed on with the investigation even though Wu Zetian and the chancellor Yang Zaisi signaled to him that he should stop the investigation. He even had Wu Zetian approve an interrogation of Zhang Changzong, although as the interrogation had just commenced, Wu Zetian issued an edict pardoning Zhang Changzong. Song sighed, "I should have first cracked that villain's skull." When Wu Zetian subsequently had Zhang Changzong try to meet Song to thank him for the release, Song refused to meet Zhang Changzong.

== During Emperor Zhongzong's second reign ==
In 705, Wu Zetian was overthrown in a coup, and Li Xian, formerly emperor, was restored to the throne (as Emperor Zhongzong). Song Jing became the deputy minister of civil service affairs (吏部侍郎), and as Emperor Zhongzong favored Song for his morals, he also gave Song the title of imperial consultant (諫議大夫, Jianyi Daifu). Soon thereafter, he was made Huangmen Shilang (黃門侍郎), the deputy head of the examination bureau of government (門下省, Menxia Sheng). At that time, Wu Zetian's nephew and Emperor Zhongzong's cousin Wu Sansi the Prince of Dejing, who was also the lover of Emperor Zhongzong's powerful wife Empress Wei, was very powerful. On one occasion, Wu Sansi made a request to Song and Song sternly rejected, stating:

Now, Her Imperial Majesty has returned the power to her son. Your Royal Highness should return to your mansion. Why are you still interfering with government. Do you not see what happened to Lü Chan [(呂產)] and Lü Lu [(呂祿)]? (Note: Lü Chan and Lü Lu were nephews of Han dynasty's Empress Lü Zhi, who served as empress dowager and the effective ruler during the reigns of her son Emperor Hui of Han and grandsons Emperor Qianshao of Han and Emperor Houshao of Han. After her death, Lü Chan and Lü Lu controlled power briefly before the Lü clan was wiped out in a coup known as the Lü Clan Disturbance. See Zizhi Tongjian, vol. 13.)

In summer 706, when the hermit Wei Yuejiang (韋月將) submitted an accusation of the adulterous relationship between Wu Sansi and Empress Wei, Emperor Zhongzong was incensed and was set to execute Wei Yuejiang. Song refused, stating that executing Wei Yuejiang would merely bring more rumors and that if Emperor Zhongzong were to execute Wei Yuejiang, he needed to execute Song first. Meanwhile, other officials, including Su Xiang (蘇珦), Xu Jian (徐堅), and Yin Sizhen (尹思貞), pointed out that it was inappropriate to execute anyone during the summer. Emperor Zhongzong thus spared Wei Yuejiang and exiled him to the Lingnan region. (However, Wei Yuejiang ultimately was unable to escape death, as Empress Wei's associate Zhou Rengui (周仁軌), then the commandant at Guang Prefecture (廣州, roughly modern Guangzhou, Guangdong), executed Wei Yuejiang as soon as fall came.) Soon thereafter, Wu Sansi had Song sent out of the capital to serve as acting prefect of Bei Prefecture (貝州, in modern Xingtai). Once Song got to Bei Prefecture, he further offended Wu Sansi—as he refused to have tax payments due Wu Sansi as his fief paid to Wu Sansi, citing that the region had just suffered a flood. He was moved to be the prefect of the more distant Hang Prefecture (杭州, roughly modern Hangzhou, Zhejiang), and later served as the prefect of Xiang Prefecture (相州, in modern Handan). It was said that he was clean but strict as a prefect, and his subordinates did not dare to be corrupt.

== During Emperor Shang's reign and Emperor Ruizong's second reign ==
Emperor Zhongzong died suddenly in 710—a death that traditional historians believed to be a poisoning carried out by Empress Wei and her daughter Li Guo'er the Princess Anle, so that Empress Wei could become "emperor" like Wu Zetian and Li Guo'er could be crown princess. Meanwhile, though, Emperor Zhongzong's son by a concubine, Li Chongmao the Prince of Wen, was named emperor (as Emperor Shang), but Empress Wei retained power as empress dowager and regent. Song Jing was made the secretary general of Luo Prefecture (洛州), which contained the eastern capital Luoyang. Less than a month later, Empress Dowager Wei and Li Guo'er were killed in a coup led by Emperor Zhongzong's sister Princess Taiping and nephew Li Longji the Prince of Linzi. Li Longji's father Li Dan the Prince of Dan, himself a former emperor, returned to the throne (as Emperor Ruizong).

Emperor Ruizong made Song the minister of civil service affairs (吏部尚書) and gave him the designation Tong Zhongshu Menxia Sanpin (同中書門下三品), making him a chancellor de facto. After Li Longji was created crown prince, Song was also made a member of his staff. During Emperor Zhongzong's reign, the civil service affairs system was subject to great abuses by powerful individuals at court, particularly while the chancellors Cui Shi and Zheng Yin were in charge — as they were allowing bribes and pleas by powerful individuals to influence them, going as far as naming reserve officials two years in advance. Song and his deputies Li Ai (李乂) and Lu Chongyuan (盧從愿) reformed the system and put the civil service system back in order, at the same time that Song's fellow chancellor Yao Yuanzhi, who was then also minister of defense, put the military promotion system back in order as well. It was said that popular sentiment at the time viewed this as the return to the clean government of the days of Emperor Gaozong's father Emperor Taizong. Song's reforms included removing all of the several thousands of officials that Emperor Zhongzong commissioned directly without submitting the commissions to the examination bureau for review.

Meanwhile, Princess Taiping and Li Longji were beginning to have discord, as both tried to influence Emperor Ruizong's administration. Princess Taiping, finding Li Longji difficult to control, began considering trying to replace him as crown prince with one of two nephews with arguable better claims than Li Longji—Li Longji's older brother Li Chengqi the Prince of Song and his cousin Li Shouli the Prince of Bin, the son of Emperor Zhongzong's older brother Li Xián (note different tone), who had been crown prince at one point during Emperor Gaozong's reign. When she hinted that Li Longi should be replaced at a meeting she had with the chancellors, the other chancellors all did not dare to speak, but Song directly responded:

The Eastern Palace (Note: The Eastern Palace was where the Crown Prince lived, and is often used as a circumspect way to refer to the Crown Prince.) had done great things for the realm, and he is truly the lord for the ancestral temples and worship. Why does Your Royal Highness suddenly have this thought?

In spring 711, Song and Yao suggested to Emperor Ruizong that the way to stop the rumors about Li Longji's being replaced would be to send Princess Taiping and her husband Wu Youji to live in Luoyang, while sending Li Chengqi and Li Shouli out of the capital Chang'an to be prefectural prefects. Emperor Ruizong initially agreed (with the exception that he believed that Luoyang was too far, and therefore was ready to send Princess Taiping to Wu Youji to Pu Prefecture (蒲州, roughly modern Yuncheng, Shanxi) instead), but after Princess Taiping found out and objected vehemently, Li Longji, fearful of consequences, disavowed and denounced Song and Yao. Emperor Ruizong removed both from their chancellor positions and demoted them to be prefectural prefects—in Song's case, to be the prefect of Chu Prefecture (楚州, roughly modern Huai'an, Jiangsu). He later served successively as the prefect of Yan Prefecture (兗州, roughly modern Jining, Shandong), Ji Prefecture (冀州, roughly modern Hengshui, Hebei), and Wei Prefecture (魏州, in modern Handan); the examiner of Hebei Circuit (河北, roughly modern Hebei, Beijing, and Tianjin); the commandant at You Prefecture (幽州, roughly modern Beijing); and principal of the imperial university (國子祭酒, Guozi Jijiu), being in charge of Luoyang. He was then recalled to Chang'an to serve as the secretary general of the capital prefecture Yong Prefecture (雍州, roughly modern Xi'an, Shaanxi).

== During Emperor Xuanzong's reign ==
In 712, Emperor Ruizong passed the throne to Li Longji, who took the throne as Emperor Xuanzong. In 713, after Emperor Xuanzong converted Yong and Luo Prefectures to special municipalities, Song was made the mayor of Jingzhao Municipality (京兆府, i.e., the old Yong Prefecture). As of 715, he was serving as chief imperial censor (御史大夫, Yushi Daifu), when, on one occasion, he was accused of not ordering for greater force to be applied when a criminal was being caned, and he was demoted to be the prefect of Mu Prefecture (睦州, in modern Hangzhou). He was later made the commandant at Guang Prefecture (廣州, roughly modern Guangzhou, Guangdong). It was said that at that time, the people of Guang Prefecture used bamboo to build houses, and therefore the houses were prone to fires. Song promoted the use of bricks, which greatly reduced the damage of fires, and the people of the region were grateful for this.

As of 716, Yao Yuanzhi—who had changed his name to Yao Chong by that point—and Lu Huaishen were serving as chancellors. Lu died in late 716, and before he did, submitted a petition arguing that Song and several other officials, Li Jie (李傑), Li Chaoyin (李朝隱), and Lu Chongyuan had been demoted only of minor offenses and, as they were talented, should be repromoted. Meanwhile, Yao was drawing displeasure from Emperor Xuanzong due to accusations that his sons and associate Zhao Hui (趙誨) were corrupt. Yao, in fear, offered to resign and recommended Song to succeed him. Emperor Xuanzong, who was then preparing to go to Luoyang, thus recalled Song to serve as the minister of justice (刑部尚書, Xingbu Shangshu) and be in charge of Chang'an. He sent one of his close eunuch associates, Yang Sixu (楊思勗), to Guang Prefecture to escort Song back to the capital. Yang had many past achievements—including putting down a coup during Emperor Zhongzong's reign led by Emperor Zhongzong's crown prince Li Chongjun—and was honored by the emperor, but on the trip back to Chang'an, Song, who did not like to ingratiate the emperor's associates, did not say anything to him. When Yang informed Emperor Xuanzong of this, Emperor Xuanzong was even more impressed with Song. Around the new year 717, he removed Yao and fellow chancellor Yuan Qianyao from their chancellor posts and replaced them with Song and Su Ting—naming Song Huangmen Jian (黃門監, the head of the examination bureau, which by that point had been renamed Huangmen Sheng (黃門省)) and acting minister of civil service affairs. Emperor Xuanzong also created Song the Duke of Guangping. Song and Su worked well together, with Song taking the leading role and Su the assisting role. With Yao having distinguished himself as one who modified the regulations to fit the situation and Song known for following the laws strictly and fairly, it was said that while their styles were different, they were both considered great chancellors of Emperor Xuanzong's reign. Song was also known for often making suggestions to correct Emperor Xuanzong's and governmental officials' behavior, thus causing Emperor Xuanzong to respect him more. These actions included:

- In spring 717, when Emperor Xuanzong was heading to Luoyang, he saw that the roads were not in good condition and initially was angry, wanting to arrest the mayor of Henan Municipality (i.e., Luoyang) and the official in charge of the itinerary. Song pointed out that this would have the undesirable effect of causing the officials to put many citizens to labor to repair the roads. Emperor Xuanzong was set to release the two, but Song then pointed out that if he did so immediate, the officials would be grateful to Song, not to him, and therefore suggested that he should order the two to report to the place of investigation and then release them there.
- In fall 717, under Song's suggestion, Emperor Xuanzong restored the customs during Emperor Taizong's times that officials were not to meet the emperor privately without imperial chroniclers and advisors present, to promote openness.
- In winter 717, when Emperor Xuanzong requested that Song and Su submit a number of formal names and titles for his sons and daughters—but separately requested a set of particularly honorable names, presumably for a favorite son—Song and Su pointed out that this would be viewed as favoritism, and therefore submitted a group of names without any designation as to what were particularly honorable names.
- When Song found out that the officials of Guang Prefecture had established a monument for him, he informed that Emperor Xuanzong that he believed that the act was mere flattery, trying to ingratiate him as a chancellor. He suggested that not only the monument be abolished, but that such actions be prohibited in the future, and Emperor Xuanzong agreed.
- When Emperor Xuanzong's father-in-law Wang Renjiao (王仁皎) died, Wang Renjiao's son Wang Shouyi (王守一) requested that a tomb be built for Wang Renjiao that would be as large as Emperor Xuanzong's maternal grandfather Dou Xiaochen (竇孝諶), and Emperor Xuanzong initially agreed. Song and Su pointed out that Dou's tomb was already considered overly wasteful and should not be followed. Emperor Xuanzong agreed, and reduced the scale of Wang Renjiao's tomb.
- When Emperor Xuanzong wanted to give an extraordinary promotion to Wang Renchen (王仁琛) -- a former staff member of his who also appeared to be Wang Renjiao's cousin—Song pointed out that this was unfair favoritism, and that Wang Renchen might deserve an award but not an extraordinary promotion.
- When Song Yuanchao (宋元超), a reserve official who was also a cousin of Song Jing's father Song Xuanfu, tried to use the connection to gain influence on the civil service officials, Song Jing found out and removed Song Yuanchao from the roll of reserve officials.
- When Li Chengqi, whose name had been changed to Li Xiàn at this point and who was greatly honored by Emperor Xuanzong as an older brother, recommended a relative named Xue Sixian (薛嗣先) as an official, Song pointed out that this would be unfair favoritism as well, and recommended that Xue's service be reexamined.
- It had been customary that the liaison officers that the regional governments sent to Chang'an carried large sums of money and treasure to Chang'an—and they were then often kept at Chang'an as officials, creating the perception that they had bribed powerful individuals. Song changed the regulations such that such liaison officers were required to return to the regional governments.

By 720, however, Song's strictness would eventually bring his removal. Song had ordered that individuals who had repeatedly appealed their cases without cause be detained by the imperial censors, until they were willing to drop their appeals. This drew much anger from people. At that time, there happened to be a drought, which, according to popular beliefs at the time, would be accompanied by the appearance of a spirit known as the Hanba (旱魃). One day, while Emperor Xuanzong was watching a play, an actor dressed as the Hanba, and stated:

There are over 300 people saddled with unfair judgments. The chancellor has locked them all up, and therefore I am forced to appear.

Meanwhile, further, Song and Su were strictly prohibiting the use of damaged coins, which they had tried to replace with newly minted coins. However, the damaged coins were still in circulation despite the prohibition, particularly in the region between the Yangtze River and the Huai River. Song sent the imperial censor Xiao Yinzhi (蕭隱之) to the region to be in charge of collecting the damaged coins and taking them out of circulation. Xiao was strict in his behavior, drawing much resentment. Emperor Xuanzong, when he heard this, demoted Xiao, and in spring 720 removed Song and Su from their chancellor posts, giving Song the honorific title of Kaifu Yitong Sansi (開府儀同三司) instead. He replaced Song and Su with Yuan and Zhang Jiazhen.

In 722, while Emperor Xuanzong was at Luoyang, there was a coup attempt at Chang'an by the army officer Quan Chubi (權楚畢), who had his nephew Quan Liangshan (權梁山) claim to be the son of Emperor Shang and therefore deserving of the throne. The coup attempt was put down quickly, and Quan Chubi was killed. Emperor Xuanzong sent the mayor of Hunan Municipality, Wang Yi (王怡), to Chang'an to investigate. Wang detained a large number of people but could not quickly come to resolutions as to who were responsible. Emperor Xuanzong made Song in charge of Chang'an and had him investigate. Song quickly determined who were the leaders and had them executed, and at his request, Emperor Xuanzong pardoned the rest of the detainees. In 724, when Emperor Xuanzong was set to visit Luoyang again, he again made Song in charge of Chang'an and made him minister of civil service affairs; he also awarded Song with silk. Around 725, when Emperor Xuanzong's trusted general Wang Maozhong (王毛仲) was set to have his daughter married, he invited the key government officials to the wedding banquet—but Song declined; Wang, who wanted the honor of Song's attendance, had Emperor Xuanzong order Song to attend, which Song did, but as soon as he had the chance to toast the emperor, he then claimed illness and left the banquet.

In 729, Song was made You Chengxiang (右丞相), one of the heads of the executive bureau of government (尚書省, Shangshu Sheng). The day that Song was to take office, Yuan and Zhang Shuo were to take new offices as well, Emperor Xuanzong set up a grand ceremony for their inauguration, including an elaborate tent, music, and food from the imperial kitchen. Emperor Xuanzong personally wrote a poem commemorating the contributions of the three.

In 730, when the chancellor Pei Guangting took the office of minister of civil service affairs as well, Pei instituted a system of promotion based on seniority. Song argued fervently against it, believing that this would cause capable people to be stuck in low positions, but Emperor Xuanzong did not agree.

In 733, Song retired and took residence in Luoyang, and Emperor Xuanzong ordered that full salaries be paid to Song notwithstanding his retirement. In 734, when Emperor Xuanzong visited Luoyang, Song came out of his mansion to greet the emperor, and Emperor Xuanzong had his son Li Huang (李滉) the Prince of Rong personally comfort Song, and thereafter frequently sent medicines and delicacies to Song. Song died in 737 and was given posthumous honors.

== Notes and references ==
- Old Book of Tang, vol. 96.
- New Book of Tang, vol. 124.
- Zizhi Tongjian, vols. 207, 208, 209, 210, 211, 212, 213, 214.
