= Su Liangsi =

Chinese Tang chancellor

Su Liangsi (Chinese: 蘇良嗣) (606 – February 24, 690), noble title Duke of Wen (溫國公), was an official of the Chinese Tang dynasty, serving as chancellor during the reign of Wu Zetian.

== Background ==
Su Liangsi was born in 606, during the reign of Emperor Yang of Sui. His father Su Shizhang (蘇世長) was an official for the Sui dynasty and had been an official for Sui's predecessor Northern Zhou. After Sui's fall in 619, Su initially submitted to one of the contenders to succeed Sui, Wang Shichong the Emperor of Zheng, but after Zheng was defeated by Tang dynasty forces in 621, submitted to Tang and became a Tang official, subsequently serving under its first two emperors Emperor Gaozu and Emperor Taizong. Su's family was from Yong Prefecture (雍州, roughly modern Xi'an, Shaanxi) -- the capital prefecture for both Sui and Tang.

== During Emperor Gaozong's reign ==
During the reign of Emperor Taizong's son Emperor Gaozong, Su Liangsi served as the military advisor to Emperor Gaozong's son Li Xian the Prince of Zhou. It was said that because Li Xian was young, his behaviors were often against regulations; Su would sternly advise against such behavior, and Li Xian feared and respected him. It was also said that many staff members were not capable officials, but Su carefully governed the staff and there were few violations against regulations, earning him much praise from Emperor Gaozong.

Later in Emperor Gaozong's reign, he was made the secretary general at Jing Prefecture (荊州, roughly modern Jingzhou, Hubei). On an occasion in 682, Emperor Gaozong sent eunuchs to the Yangtze River region to seek out unusual bamboo plants, hoping to transplant them to the imperial garden. The eunuchs were said to abuse this authority to overpower the people, and when they went through Jing Prefecture, Su arrested them and submitted a petition to Emperor Gaozong, stating, "Looking for unusual things afar and disturbing the regions on the way is not the way for holy ones to show that they love the people. Further, these frivolous persons are abusing their authority and causing damage to the imperial reputation." Emperor Gaozong commented to his powerful wife Empress Wu (later known as Wu Zetian), "I did not think this through carefully, and I drew a rebuke from Su Liangsi." He wrote an edict thanking Su, and ordered that the collected bamboo plants be thrown into the river.

However, while serving at Jing Prefecture, Su was also involved in an embarrassing event that caused people to believe that he did not study well. In Jing Prefecture was a Buddhist temple that Emperor Xuan of Western Liang had built named Hedong Temple (河東寺), dedicated to Emperor Xuan's older brother Xiao Yu (蕭譽) the Prince of Hedong, who had been killed early by their uncle Emperor Yuan of Liang. Su, when he saw the temple, unaware of its connection with the Prince of Hedong, commented, "What does Hedong have to do with this region between the Yangtze and the Han River?" (Hedong originally referred to the region east of the Yellow River, in modern Shanxi.) He submitted a request, later approved, that the temple be torn down. This caused the people of the region to complain that he was unaware of history.

During Emperor Gaozong's Yongchun era (682-683), Su was made the secretary general of Yong Prefecture. At that time, the Guanzhong region (i.e., the region around the capital Chang'an) was suffering from a famine that was so severe that people resorted to cannibalism, and there were many thefts and robberies. Su was said to be a strict governor, and criminal cases were usually solved within three days.

== During Empress dowager Wu's regency ==
Emperor Gaozong died in 683 and was succeeded by Li Xian (then Crown Prince with the name Li Zhe) (as Emperor Zhongzong), but actual power was in the hands of Empress Wu, as empress dowager and regent. In 684, when Emperor Zhongzong showed signs of independence, she deposed him and replaced him with his brother Li Dan the Prince of Yu (as Emperor Ruizong), but thereafter held onto power even more firmly. Around this time, Su Liangsi was made the minister of public works, and in 685 he was made Nayan (納言) -- the head of the examination bureau of government and a post considered one for a chancellor, replacing Wang Dezhen. As Empress Dowager Wu had taken up permanent residence at the eastern capital Luoyang, Su was made the official in charge of Chang'an; he was also created the Duke of Wen. As he departed Luoyang, Empress Dowager Wu personally recited a poem to send him off. At that time, the director of imperial constructions, Pei Feigong (裴匪躬), was in charge of the imperial garden at Chang'an and proposed that the fruits and vegetables in the garden be gathered and sold to supplement the imperial budget. Su rejected the proposal, pointing out that it was inappropriate for the imperial government to be competing on the market with farmers.

In 686, Su was recalled to Luoyang to serve as Wenchang Zuo Xiang (文昌左相) -- one of the heads of the executive bureau and also a post for a chancellor—and further given the chancellor designation Tong Fengge Luantai Sanpin (同鳳閣鸞臺三品). Around this time, there was an incident where he encountered Empress Dowager Wu's lover, the Buddhist monk Huaiyi. Huaiyi did not greet him and displayed himself arrogantly. In anger, Su ordered his guards to seize Huaiyi and slap him. When Huaiyi complained to Empress Dowager Wu, she responded semi-jocularly, "Your Eminence should enter through the North Gate [(i.e., directly into the palace without going through the governmental buildings to the south of the palace)]. The Southern Palace is where chancellors gather; do not violate it."

In spring 690, Su was removed from his post as head of the executive bureau, but was given the honorific title Tejin (特進) and continued to serve as a chancellor de facto with the Tong Fengge Luantai Sanpin designation. He was said to have a poor relationship with fellow chancellor Wei Fangzhi, and later that spring, when Wei was accused of capital offenses, Wei, during interrogation, intentionally stated that Su was related to the case as well. Empress Dowager Wu, however, stated publicly herself that she did not believe Su was involved, and Su, in fear, bowed to her to thank her, but could not get up after bowing. He was delivered on an imperial wagon back to his house, and Empress Dowager Wu sent the imperial physicians Zhang Wenzhong (張文仲) and Wei Cizang (韋慈藏) to look after him. Still, he died that same day and was buried with great honors. However, soon, after his son Su Jianyan (蘇踐言) was accused of crimes and exiled to the Lingnan region, Su Liangsi's honors were posthumously stripped, and his assets were seized. His other sons Su Jianzhong (蘇踐忠) and Su Jianyi (蘇踐義) were also involved. Su Jianyan died in Lingnan. In 707, after Emperor Zhongzong had been restored to the throne in 705, Su Liangsi's titles were restored, and Su Jianyan's son Su Wuxuan (蘇務玄) was allowed to inherit the title of Duke of Wen.

== Notes and references ==
- Old Book of Tang, vol. 75.
- New Book of Tang, vol. 103.
- Zizhi Tongjian, vols. 203, 204.
