= Liu Yizhi =

Chinese politician of the Tang dynasty

Liu Yizhi (劉禕之; 631 – June 22, 687), courtesy name Ximei (希美), was a Chinese politician of the Tang dynasty, serving as chancellor during the first reign of Emperor Ruizong. He was initially a trusted advisor of Emperor Ruizong's powerful mother Empress Dowager Wu (later known as Wu Zetian), but later offended her by suggesting privately that she should return imperial powers to Emperor Ruizong, and in 687, she ordered him to commit suicide.

== Background ==
Liu Yizhi was born in 631, during the reign of Emperor Taizong of Tang. His grandfather Liu Xingzong (劉興宗) had served as an army officer during Chen dynasty, and his father Liu Ziyi (劉子翼) was an official and scholar of renown during Sui dynasty and the early Tang dynasty, dying early in the reign of Emperor Taizong's son Emperor Gaozong.

Liu Yizhi himself was said to be literarily talented, and his reputation was compared to contemporaries Meng Lizhen (孟利貞), Gao Zhizhou, and Guo Zhengyi. Eventually, all four were retained to be imperial scholars at the Zhaowen Pavilion (昭文館).

== During Emperor Gaozong's reign and Empress dowager's Wu regency ==
During Emperor Gaozong's Shangyuan 上元 era (674–676), Liu Yizhi was made an imperial chronicler, and a scholar at Hongwen Pavilion (弘文館). He and several colleagues also known for literary talent—Yuan Wanqing (元萬頃), Fan Lübing, Miao Chuke (苗楚客), Zhou Simao (周思茂), and Han Chubin (韓楚賓)—were asked to serve as advisors to Emperor Gaozong's powerful wife Empress Wu (later known as Wu Zetian), and they wrote a number of works on her behalf, including the Biographies of Notable Women (列女傳), Guidelines for Imperial Subjects (臣軌), and New Teachings for Official Staff Members (百僚新誡). Collectively, they became known as the "North Gate Scholars" (北門學士), because they served inside the palace, which was to the north of the imperial government buildings, and Empress Wu sought advice from them to divert the powers of the chancellors. At that time, both he and his brother Liu Yizhi (劉懿之, note different character) served in government, a fact that impressed many people.

In 677, Liu was made the assistant head of the legislative bureau of government (中書省, Zhongshu Sheng) and the military advisor to Emperor Gaozong's and Empress Wu's youngest son Li Lun (the later Emperor Ruizong). However, it was at this time that an incident involving his sister would cause him to be exiled. His sister was serving in a position inside the palace. Empress Wu had sent her to visit Empress Wu's mother Lady Yang, the Lady of Rong, at that time. Against regulations, when Liu Yizhi found out about this, he went to Lady Yang's mansion to meet his sister. As a result of this violation, he was exiled to Xi Prefecture (巂州, roughly modern Liangshan Yi Autonomous Prefecture, Sichuan) for several years.

Later, at Empress Wu's request, Liu Yizhi was recalled from exile, and he was made Zhongshu Sheren (中書舍人), a mid-level official at the legislative bureau, and again the military advisor to Li Lun (whose name was by then changed to Li Dan and whose title was then the Prince of Xiang). He also soon again became the assistant head of the legislative bureau. Emperor Gaozong was impressed with Liu Yizhi's family's reputation for faithfulness and filial piety, and had once told Liu, "The Prince of Xiang is my beloved son. Because you come from a family of faithfulness and filial piety, I want you to teach and guide him." It was further said that Liu himself was filially pious and caring for his siblings, and that he was generous with his salaries, often giving them to relatives with need, and that this further impressed Emperor Gaozong.

Emperor Gaozong died in 683 and was succeeded by Li Dan's older brother Li Zhe the Crown Prince (as Emperor Zhongzong), but Empress Wu retained All of the power, as empress dowager and regent. In 684, after Emperor Zhongzong showed signs of independence, she deposed him and replaced him with Li Dan (as Emperor Ruizong). Liu was involved in the planning for this, and he was, in return, given the designation Tong Zhongshu Menxia Sanpin (同中書門下三品), making him a chancellor de facto. He was also created the Baron of Linhuai. It was said that at that time, the edicts issued by Empress Dowager Wu and Emperor Ruizong were mostly drafted by Liu, and that he wrote them well and quickly.

== During Empress dowager's Wu regency ==
In 685, there was an incident that made Empress Dowager Wu trust Liu Yizhi even more. At that time, the official Fang Xianmin (房先敏) was demoted, and he met the chancellors to complain about the demotion. Qian Weidao told Fang, "This was the Empress Dowager's decision." Liu instead stated, "You were dragged into this because of another's fault, and your demotion was based on the decision of the officials." These words were reported to Empress Dowager Wu, and she was displeased that Qian blamed her and pleased that Liu did not, and she demoted Qian to be a prefectural prefect while bestowing Liu with the honorific title Taizhong Daifu (太中大夫).

However, in 687, it would be Liu's words that would bring his downfall. He had secretly told his subordinate Jia Dayin (賈大隱), "Given that the Empress Dowager had deposed an incompetent emperor and replaced him with an intelligent one, why does she still need to serve as regent? It would be better if she returned imperial powers to him to comfort the people of the empire." Jia reported these words to Empress Dowager Wu, who saw this as a betrayal of her trust in him. As a result, false accusations were made that Liu had received bribes from the Khitan chieftain Sun Wanrong, and that he had carried out an adulterous relationship with the concubine of the deceased chancellor Xu Jingzong. Empress Dowager Wu ordered Wang Benli the prefect of Su Prefecture (肅州, roughly modern Jiuquan, Gansu) investigate this. When Wang arrived at Liu's mansion and read Empress Dowager Wu's edict to Liu, Liu made the comment, "How can it be called an edict if it was not issued through the legislative and examination bureaus?" When Wang reported this to Empress Dowager Wu, she was incensed, and she accused Liu of resisting an imperial edict and arrested him.

Emperor Ruizong, who was friendly with Liu, sought to save him by submitting a petition to Empress Dowager Wu. When this was known, Liu's relatives and friends congratulated him in that even the emperor was interceding on his behalf. Liu, however, commented, "I will surely die because of this. The Empress Dowager is serving as regent. She decides matters herself and holds onto her power. A petition from the Emperor will only hasten disaster." Soon, Empress Dowager Wu issued an order for him to commit suicide. Without change in expression, he bathed and asked his son to draft a submission to Empress Dowager Wu thanking her for granting him his death. His son was so mournful as to be unable to write, so Liu wrote the submission himself and did so quickly. After his death, everyone who read the submission was deeply touched, and junior officials Guo Han (郭翰) and Zhou Sijun (周思均) particularly were complimentary of the writing—displeasing Empress Dowager Wu so much that she exiled both of them.

Emperor Ruizong would eventually yield the throne to Empress Dowager Wu, who took the throne as "emperor" herself, in 690. After Emperor Ruizong returned to the throne in 710, he remembered Liu, and he posthumously honored him as Zhongshu Ling (中書令, head of the legislative bureau).

== Notes and references ==
- Old Book of Tang, vol. 87.
- New Book of Tang, vol. 117.
- Zizhi Tongjian, vols. 202, 203, 204.
