= Dou Dexuan =

Dou Dexuan (Chinese: 竇德玄; 598 – September 11, 666), formally Baron Gong of Julu (鉅鹿恭男), was an official of the Chinese Tang dynasty, serving as chancellor during the reign of Emperor Gaozong of Tang.

== Background ==
Dou Dexuan was born in 598, during the reign of Emperor Wen of Sui. His family had been a hereditary aristocratic family during Sui and its predecessor dynasties Northern Zhou and Western Wei, and his grandfather Dou Zhao (竇照) had married a daughter of Western Wei's paramount general and ancestor to Northern Zhou's imperial house, Yuwen Tai, who was later known as Princess Yiyang during Northern Zhou, and he was created the Duke of Julu. Dou Dexuan's father Dou Yan (竇彥) inherited the title and served as a commandery governor during Sui. His older brother Dou Deming (竇德明) served on the staff of Emperor Taizong of Tang while he was the Prince of Qin. His granduncle Dou Wei was chancellor during the reign of Emperor Taizong's father and Tang's founder Emperor Gaozu.

Dou Dexuan himself was said to start his career in civil service when he was first an imperial university student during the reign of Emperor Yang of Sui. He served as a guard commander for Emperor Gaozu of Tang briefly before he seized the throne from Yang You, in 517 or 518. His activities during Emperor Gaozu's reign were not clear, but historical records indicated that he did not have much success in the political arena during Emperor Taizong's reign.

== During Emperor Gaozong's reign ==
It was said that after Emperor Gaozong became emperor in 649, Dou had served as deputy director of palace affairs, and he was promoted to the post of imperial censor on the basis of his long service to the empire. In or after 662, probably in 664, he was promoted to the post of minister of census, a more important post. It was said that he was one of more than a dozen officials who were promoted around the same time by Emperor Gaozong personally, including the future chancellors Liu Xiangdao, Shangguan Yi, and Hao Chujun, and it was recorded also that Emperor Gaozong selected them "to show the chancellors, including Li Ji," although what exactly Emperor Gaozong was showing the chancellors was not clearly stated. In 664, he was also made acting Zuo Xiang (左相) -- the head of the examination bureau of government and a post considered one for a chancellor.

It was said that Dou, as chancellor, was hard-working and careful. In 665, as Emperor Gaozong was planning to sacrifice to heaven and earth at Mount Tai, and he had Dou and Li Ji serve as his attendants. On the way from the eastern capital Luoyang to Mount Tai, as Emperor Gaozong was passing through Puyang, Emperor Gaozong, remembering that Puyang was formerly known as Diqiu (帝丘, literally "the hill of the emperor"), asked Dou the reason, and Dou could not answer. Another chancellor, Xu Jingzong, happened to be nearby, and responded that Diqiu was named as such because the legendary emperor Zhuanxu had his capital there. Xu later made the comment, "A high level official must be knowledgeable. When I saw that Dou Dexuan could not answer, I felt ashamed for him." When Dou heard this, he said, "A person has things that he can do and things he cannot do. My ability is to know what I do not know and not pretend that I know it." The people who heard this exchange admired Dou for his honesty—particularly Li Ji, who commented, "It is a good thing that Xu Jingzong is knowledgeable. But Dou Dexuan's words were also deep truths."

After Emperor Gaozong completed the sacrifices in spring 666, he was set to upgrade Dou's title by two grades. Dou, citing that his brother Dou Deyuan (竇德遠) had no titles, offered to have the title given to Dou Deyuan instead. Emperor Gaozong partially agreed with him, creating him the Baron of Julu, while creating Dou Deyuan the Baron of Le'an. Dou Dexuan died in the fall of that year, while still serving as chancellor. It was written by historians that Dou Dexuan was a careful observer of trends and had no faults, but he also did not benefit the state by his service. His son Dou Huaizhen later also served as a chancellor.

== Notes and references ==
- New Book of Tang, vol. 95.
- Zizhi Tongjian, vol. 201.
