= Sun Chuyue =

Sun Chuyue (Chinese: 孫處約) (died 664?), alternative name Sun Maodao (孫茂道) and/or Sun Daomao (孫道茂), was an official of the Chinese Tang dynasty, serving briefly as chancellor during the reign of Emperor Gaozong of Tang.

== During Emperor Taizong's reign ==
Sun Chuyue was from Ru Prefecture (汝州, roughly modern Runan, Henan). During the reign of Emperor Taizong, he served on the staff of Emperor Taizong's son Li You (李祐) the Prince of Qi. It was said that Li You lacked virtues, and Sun often submitted suggestions to him to change his behavior. After Li You failed in rebelling against his father in 643 and was killed, Emperor Taizong personally examined Li You's archives and found Sun's suggestions; he greatly praised them.

== During Emperor Gaozong's reign ==
Sun Chuyue later was promoted, during the reign of Emperor Taizong's son and successor Emperor Gaozong, to be Zhongshu Sheren (中書舍人), one of the mid-level officials at the legislative bureau of government (中書省, Zhongshu Sheng). That year, the head of the legislative bureau, the chancellor Du Zhenglun, requested that one more official be commissioned as Zhongshu Sheren, but Emperor Gaozong responded, "Sun Chuyue is enough to accomplish the task. Why do we need more?" Later, he participated in compiled the imperial archives of Emperor Taizong's reign, and after the archives were compiled, he was given an award of silk. He was later promoted to be Zhongshu Shilang (中書侍郎), the deputy head of the legislative bureau. He was still in that post around new year 665 (but now with the title of Xi Tai Shilang (西臺侍郎), as the Zhongshu Sheng was renamed to Xi Tai during the meantime) when he was given the designation Tong Dong Xi Tai Sanpin (同東西臺三品), making him a chancellor de facto. Four months later, however, he, along with his colleague Le Yanwei, were no longer chancellors. It was further said that later, for unspecified reasons, he was demoted to be the deputy minister of ceremony. In 664, he was made the deputy principal of the imperial university, when he requested to retire on basis of old age. He died soon thereafter.
