= Liu Jingxian =

Liu Jingxian (Chinese: 劉景先; died 689), né Liu Qixian (劉齊賢), was a Chinese politician of the Tang dynasty, serving as chancellor late in the reign of Emperor Gaozong and the subsequent regency of Emperor Gaozong's wife Empress Dowager Wu over their sons Emperor Zhongzong and Emperor Ruizong. In 684, Liu offended Empress Dowager Wu by defending fellow chancellor Pei Yan against charges of treason. He was arrested and then exiled. He was rearrested in 689 and committed suicide by hanging.

== Background ==
It is not known when Liu Qixian was born. His family was from what would become Wei Prefecture (魏州, part of modern Handan, Hebei). His grandfather Liu Linfu (劉林甫) served as a mid-level official under Tang dynasty's founder Emperor Gaozu and his son and successor Emperor Taizong, and carried the title of Baron of Leping, a title that Liu Qixian's father Liu Xiangdao inherited. Liu Xiangdao later served as chancellor during the reign of Emperor Taizong's son Emperor Gaozong and was created the Duke of Guangping. He died in 666, and Liu Qixian inherited the title.

== During Emperor Gaozong's reign ==
Liu Qixian had, at one point, served as an assistant imperial censor, before becoming the military advisor to the prefect of Bing Prefecture (并州, roughly modern Taiyuan, Shanxi). Emperor Gaozong heard of his integrity and respected him. On one occasion, when the general Shi Xingzong (史興宗) attended to Emperor Gaozong during a hunt, Shi stated that Bing Prefecture was known for its hunting eagles and that Emperor Gaozong should have Liu seize some and deliver them to Emperor Gaozong. Emperor Gaozong responded, "Is Liu Qixian someone who should be capturing eagles? Why do you treat him like this?" He declined Shi's suggestion. At one point, to observe naming taboo of the name of Emperor Gaozong's second crown prince Li Xian, Liu Qixian changed his name to Liu Jingxian (different character).

As of 682, Liu was serving as Huangmen Shilang (黃門侍郎), the deputy head of the examination bureau of government (門下省, Menxia Sheng), when he was given the designation Tong Zhongshu Menxia Sanpin (同中書門下三品), making him a chancellor de facto. In late 683, when Emperor Gaozong grew critically ill, he had the crown prince Li Zhe (Li Xian's brother, who replaced Li Xian as crown prince after Li Xian was deposed in 680) take over matters of state, assisted by Liu, Pei Yan, and Guo Zhengyi. He died soon thereafter, and Li Zhe took the throne (as Emperor Zhongzong), although his mother (Emperor Gaozong's wife) Empress Dowager Wu maintained her power.

== During Empress Dowager Wu's regency ==
Around the new year 684, Liu Jingxian was made Shizhong (侍中) -- the head of the examination bureau and a post considered one for a chancellor. Soon thereafter, when Emperor Zhongzong showed signs that he would exercise independent powers, Empress Dowager Wu deposed him and replaced him with his brother Li Dan the Prince of Yu (as Emperor Ruizong), but held onto power even more firmly. As Pei Yan several times suggested that she return imperial powers to Emperor Ruizong, he soon drew her ire. After Li Jingye the Duke of Ying rose in rebellion later in 684, claiming to want to restore the emperor's powers, and Pei again proposed that Empress Dowager Wu return imperial powers to Emperor Ruizong to defuse the rebellion, Empress Dowager Wu accused him of treason and imprisoned him. While Pei was imprisoned and interrogated, a number of officials tried to intercede on his behalf—include Liu and his deputy Hu Yuanfan (胡元範). It was said that Liu and Hu said, "Pei Yan is a senior official to the state who had great accomplishments. The whole empire knows that he is careful in his service. We can guarantee that he was not treasonous." She responded, "There is evidence that he committed treason, and you do not know this." They responded, "If he is someone who would commit treason, then so are we." She responded, "I know that he committed treason, and I know that you did not commit treason." However, despite her comments, she soon arrested Liu and Hu as well. After Pei was executed later that year, Liu was demoted several times successively—to be prefect of Pu Prefecture (普州, roughly modern Ziyang, Sichuan), then the prefect of Chen Prefecture (辰州, roughly modern Huaihua, Hunan), finally the secretary general of Ji Prefecture (吉州, roughly modern Ji'an, Jiangxi). In 689, secret police in Empress Dowager Wu's administration accused Liu of crimes and arrested him. He committed suicide, and his assets were seized.

== Notes and references ==
- Old Book of Tang, vol. 81.
- New Book of Tang, vol. 106.
- Zizhi Tongjian, vols. 201, 203
