= Zhu Pu =

Zhu Pu (朱朴) was an official of the Chinese Tang dynasty, who briefly served as chancellor from 896 to 897 during the reign of Emperor Zhaozong. Emperor Zhaozong made him chancellor after he made assurances that he would be able to revive and empower the imperial administration, then suppressed by the power of the warlords, but after he was unable to deliver on the promise, he was removed and exiled at the instigation of the warlord Han Jian. He died in exile.

== Background and early career ==
Little is known about Zhu Pu's background, as his family was not included in the table of the chancellors' family trees in the New Book of Tang. It is also not known when he was born, but it is known that he was from Xiangyang and that he had, at some point, passed the imperial examinations, but not in the prestigious Jinshi (進士) class, but in the "Three Histories" class — i.e., for the Records of the Grand Historian, the Book of Han, and the Book of Later Han. After passing the imperial examinations, Zhu was initially made the magistrate of Jingmen County (荊門, in modern Jingmen, Hubei), then the archival officer at Jingzhao Municipality (京兆, i.e., the region of the imperial capital Chang'an), then an archiver at the imperial archives (著作郎, Zhuzuo Lang). Early in Emperor Zhaozong's Qianning era (894-898), the deputy secretary of commerce Li Yuanshi (李元實) made a proposal to deduct two months of pay from each imperial official to pay for military campaigns; Zhu submitted a petition against it, and Li Yuanshi's proposal was not accepted by Emperor Zhaozong.

Thereafter, Zhu was promoted to be a professor at the imperial university (國子監, Guozi Jian), teaching about the version of the Classic of Poetry annotated by the Han dynasty scholar Mao Heng (毛亨). At that time, with virtually the entire Tang realm engulfed in warfare, Zhu submitted a petition that the imperial capital be moved from Chang'an to the region of Xiang (襄州, in modern Xiangyang, Hubei) (where Zhu was from) and Deng (鄧州, in modern Nanyang, Henan) Prefectures; the petition was not acted upon.

It was said that Zhu was an excellent speaker, but was not talented otherwise. In 896, though, the imperial official He Ying (何迎) submitted a recommendation to Emperor Zhaozong, claiming that Zhu was as talented as the great Jin dynasty prime minister Xie An. The Taoist monk Xu Yanshi (許巖士), a close associate of Emperor Zhaozong's due to his medical abilities, also recommended Zhu, claiming that he had economic talent. Emperor Zhaozong met with Zhu for several days straight and was impressed by Zhu's speaking ability. He stated, "Although I am not Emperor Taizong [(an ancestor of Emperor Zhaozong's considered to be a heroic emperor at the start of Tang)], having you is like having Wei Zheng [(a great chancellor of Emperor Taizong's time)]." He gave both Zhu and He awards of gold and silk.

== Chancellorship and after chancellorship ==
By this point, Emperor Zhaozong, who, along with the imperial officers, was then at Hua Prefecture (華州, in modern Weinan, Shaanxi) to flee an attack by the warlord Li Maozhen the military governor of Fengxiang Circuit (鳳翔, headquartered in modern Baoji, Shaanxi) earlier in the year, was distressed about the state of affairs the Tang realm was in, and had the hope of finding exceptional individuals who could help him govern the state, such that he was willing to promote them in irregularly fast manners. Zhu took this opportunity and stated to Emperor Zhaozong, "Make me a chancellor, and there will be peace in just over a month." Emperor Zhaozong believed him, and in fall 896, he made Zhu Zuo Jianyi Daifu (左諫議大夫), a high-level advisory official at the examination bureau (門下省, Menxia Sheng) — and a chancellor, with the designation Tong Zhongshu Menxia Pingzhangshi (同中書門下平章事). It was said that this commission completely surprised the people because Zhu was not known for his talent and was commonly believed to be frivolous. Soon thereafter, Emperor Zhaozong also made him the acting director of taxation (判戶部, Pan Hubu) and entrusted him with all matters relating to military expenses, in preparation of a campaign against Li Maozhen.

By spring 897, with the realm as overrun by warfare as it had been previously, the people believed that Zhu's promises had failed. Han Jian the military governor of Zhenguo Circuit (鎮國, headquartered at Hua Prefecture), the warlord who had Emperor Zhaozong in his physical control, first falsely accused two of Emperor Zhaozong's associates, the astronomer Ma Daoyin (馬道殷), and Xu Yanshi, of crimes, and had them executed. He then accused Zhu and another chancellor, Sun Wo, of close association with Ma and Xu, and had them removed from chancellorship. Zhu was first made Mishu Jian (秘書監), the director of the Palace Library. Later in the year, Zhu was exiled, first to be the military advisor to the prefect of Kui Prefecture (夔州, in modern Chongqing), then to be the census officer at Chen Prefecture (郴州, in modern Chenzhou, Hunan).

== Notes and references ==
- Old Book of Tang, vol. 179.
- New Book of Tang, vol. 183.
- Zizhi Tongjian, vols. 260, 261.
