= Cui Zhiwen =

Cui Zhiwen (崔知溫; 627 – April 27, 683), courtesy name Liren (禮仁), was an official of the Chinese Tang dynasty, serving as a chancellor during the reign of Emperor Gaozong.

== Background ==
Cui Zhiwen was born in 627, during the reign of Emperor Taizong. His family was from Xu Prefecture (許州, roughly modern Xuchang, Henan), was from the "Xuzhou Yanling branch " of the prominent Cui clan of Qinghe. His grandfather Cui Shishu (崔世樞) served as the minister of agriculture, and his father Cui Yizhi (崔義直) as a prefectural prefect. At one point, he served as an officer in the imperial guard corps.

== Local government service ==
During Emperor Gaozong's Linde era (664–665), Cui Zhiwen became the military advisor to the prefect of Ling Prefecture (靈州, roughly modern Yinchuan, Ningxia). At that time, within the boundaries of the prefecture were two nomadic tribes, the Hun (渾) and the Huxue (斛薛), who were submissive to the Tang, but nevertheless were pillaging the Han residents of the prefecture. As a result, the residents could not spend their time on agriculture, and had to take up riding and archery to defend against Hun and Huxue pillages. Cui proposed that the Hun and the Huxue be moved north of the Yellow River—a proposal that the Hun and the Huxue were unwilling to agree to, and the non-Han general Qibi Heli (契苾何力) spoke on their behalf, and so Emperor Gaozong initially rejected Cui's proposal. Cui resubmitted the proposal 15 times, and eventually it was approved. When the Hun and the Huxue reached the new location, they found the pastures fertile and appreciated them. On one occasion, when the Huxue chiefs were going to the capital Chang'an to greet Emperor Gaozong, they visited Ling Prefecture and thanked Cui for his proposal which had in fact benefited the tribes.

At a later time, Cui served as the prefect of Lan Prefecture (蘭州, roughly modern Lanzhou, Gansu). On one occasion, Dangxiang forces were attacking Lan Prefecture, and there were few Tang forces within the prefecture capital, causing a great panic. Cui opened up the city gates and acted as if nothing was happening, and this caused the Dangxiang forces to believe that there were troops hidden within, and therefore went past Lan Prefecture. Later, the general Quan Shancai (權善才) arrived with a relief force and defeated the Dangxiang. Much of the Dangxiang army surrendered, and Quan initially wanted to slaughter them, stopping only after Cui pointed out that it was unfair to slaughter them all and also that this may cause a violent reaction. Quan, thankful for the suggestion, wanted to give 500 of the surrendered Dangxiang to Cui as personal property, however Cui declined, pointing out that his proposal was for the state's benefit, not personal benefit. Later, because of this, the remaining Dangxiang submitted to Cui.

== Central government service ==
At a later point, Cui Zhiwen was recalled to Chang'an to serve as a secretary general of the executive bureau of government (尚書省, Shangshu Sheng). In 680, he was made Huangmen Shilang (黃門侍郎), the deputy head of the examination bureau of government (門下省, Menxia Sheng). He was also given the designation of Tong Zhongshu Menxia Sanpin (同中書門下三品), making him a chancellor de facto. In 681, he was made acting Zhongshu Ling (中書令)—the head of the legislative bureau of government (中書省, Zhongshu Sheng) and a post considered one for a chancellor. He died in 683 and was buried with honors, with the posthumous name of Zhong (忠, "faithful").

== Notes and references ==
- New Book of Tang, vol. 106.
- Zizhi Tongjian, vols. 202, 203.
