= Le Sihui =

Le Sihui (樂思晦) (died 691) was an official during Wu Zetian's Zhou Dynasty, briefly serving as chancellor.

It is not known when Le Sihui was born. His father Le Yanwei served as chancellor during the reign of Wu Zetian's husband Emperor Gaozong of Tang. In 691, after Wu Zetian had herself assumed the title of "emperor" in 690, Le Sihui was Luantai Shilang (鸞臺侍郎), the deputy head of the examination bureau of government (鸞臺, Luantai), when Wu Zetian gave him the designation of Tong Fengge Luantai Pingzhangshi (同鳳閣鸞臺平章事), making him a chancellor de facto. About four months later, however, for reasons lost to history, he was executed. (His son, who was not yet 10 years old and whose name is lost to history, was made a servant at the ministry of agriculture, and in 692 was instrumental in submitting a petition to persuade Wu Zetian to release the officials Ren Zhigu, Di Renjie, Pei Xingben, Cui Xuanli (崔宣禮), Lu Xian (盧獻), Wei Yuanzhong, and Li Sizhen (李嗣真) after they had been arrested on suspicion of treason.)
