= Gu Cong =

Gu Cong (顧琮) (died November 4, 702) was an official of Wu Zetian's Zhou dynasty of China, briefly serving as chancellor.

Despite Gu's high status, little is firmly established about his career except for the time that he served as chancellor—as, unusual for a chancellor, he did not have a biography in either the Old Book of Tang or the New Book of Tang. It is known that his clan traced its ancestry to the Eastern Wu prime minister Gu Yong. Gu Cong's great-grandfather Gu Yue (顧越) claimed to be a 10th generation descendant of Gu Yong's, and served as a mid-level official during the Chen dynasty. Gu Cong's father Gu Yin (顧胤) served as an imperial scholar during the Tang dynasty and was created the Duke of Yuhang.

In 701, Gu Cong was serving as the deputy minister of civil service affairs (天官侍郎, Tianguan Shilang), when he was given the designation of Tong Fengge Luantai Pingzhangshi (同鳳閣鸞臺平章事), making him a chancellor de facto. Historical accounts do not give any details about his acts as chancellor, however, and he died in winter 702. His sons Gu Run (顧潤) and Gu Jun (顧浚) later served as officials as well.

== Notes and references ==
- Zizhi Tongjian, vol. 207.
