= Li Huaiyuan =

Li Huaiyuan (Chinese: 李懷遠) (died 706), courtesy name Guangde (廣德), formally Duke Cheng of Zhao Commandery (趙郡成公), was an official of the Chinese Tang dynasty and Wu Zetian's Zhou dynasty, serving twice as chancellor during the reigns of Wu Zetian and her son Emperor Zhongzong.

== Background ==
It is not known when Li Huaiyuan was born, but it is known that he was from Xing Prefecture (邢州, roughly modern Xingtai, Hebei). He lost his parents early in his life and was poor but was diligent in his studies and capable in literary matters. There was a clansman of his who had high status who wished to adopt him so that he could receive the benefit of that high status when seeking to advance in civil service, but Li Huaiyuan declined, believing doing so would be dishonorable. He eventually passed the imperial examination and entered civil service and was eventually promoted to be the deputy minister of ceremonies (司禮少卿, Sili Shaoqing).

== During Wu Zetian's reign ==
Li Huaiyuan was later commissioned to be the prefect of Xing Prefecture but declined it on account that it was inappropriate for him to govern his home prefecture and was instead made the prefect of Ji Prefecture (冀州, roughly modern Hengshui, Hebei). He later successively served as secretary general at Yang Prefecture (揚州, roughly modern Yangzhou, Jiangsu) and Yi Prefecture (益州, roughly modern Chengdu, Sichuan), eventually serving as the prefect of Tong Prefecture (同州, roughly modern Weinan, Shaanxi). He was said to be a simple and efficient prefect. At some point, he was recalled to the central government to serve as an advisor to the Crown Prince, then as a senior advisor at the examination bureau of government (鸞臺, Luantai), then the deputy minister of rites (春官侍郎, Chunguan Shilang), and then as Luantai Shilang (鸞臺侍郎), the deputy head of the examination bureau. In 701, during the reign of Wu Zetian, Li Huaiyuan was still serving as Luantai Shilang, when he was given the designation Tong Fengge Luantai Pingzhangshi (同鳳閣鸞臺平章事), making him a chancellor de facto. Five months later, he was made the minister of justice (秋官尚書, Qiuguan Shangshu), no longer a chancellor. He was also created the Baron of Pingxiang, made an advisor to the Crown Prince Li Xian, and given the honorific title Yinqing Guanglu Daifu (銀青光祿大夫). In 704, he requested retirement, and Wu Zetian removed him from his offices except as an advisor to Li Xian.

== During Emperor Zhongzong's reign ==
In 705, Wu Zetian was overthrown in a coup, and Li Xian, formerly emperor, was restored to the throne (as Emperor Zhongzong). He recalled Li Huaiyuan to serve as a senior advisor at the examination bureau and gave him the designation Tong Zhongshu Menxia Sanpin (同中書門下三品), again making him chancellor. He also created Li Huaiyuan the Duke of Zhao Commandery and gave him the honorific title Jinzi Guanglu Daifu (金紫光祿大夫). In 706, Li Huaiyuan retired again, although when Emperor Zhongzong soon departed the eastern capital Luoyang to return to the capital Chang'an, he put Li Huaiyuan in charge of Luoyang. It was said that while Li Huaiyuan was greatly honored, he lived a simple and frugal life. He did not build mansions and did not enlarge his garden. He often rode a small horse, and when his fellow chancellor Doulu Qinwang asked him, "You, Duke, are greatly honored. Why not buy a handsome horse?" Li Huaiyuan responded, "I value a horse by its tameness, not by its handsomeness." Li Huaiyuan died in fall 706 and was buried with honor, with Emperor Zhongzong personally writing his eulogy.

== Notes and references ==
- Old Book of Tang, vol. 90.
- New Book of Tang, vol. 116.
- Zizhi Tongjian, vols. 207, 208.
