= Zhang Wenguan =

Zhang Wenguan (張文瓘) (606 – September 30, 678), courtesy name Zhigui (稚圭), was an official of the Chinese Tang dynasty, serving as a chancellor during the reign of Emperor Gaozong. He was acclaimed for his fairness while serving as the chief judge of the supreme court.

== Background ==
Zhang Wenguan was born in 606, during the reign of Emperor Yang of Sui. His family was originally from what would eventually become Bei Prefecture (貝州, part of modern Xingtai, Hebei), but moved to what would eventually become Wei Prefecture (魏州, roughly modern Handan, Hebei) early in Zhang Wenguan's life. He lost his father when he was young, and was said to serve his mother and older brother(s) appropriately. Early in the reign of Emperor Taizong of Tang (r. 626–649), Zhang passed the imperial examination and was made a military advisor to the secretary general of Bing Prefecture (并州, roughly modern Taiyuan, Shanxi), Li Shiji. Li valued his service greatly, and on one occasion stated, "Zhigui is the modern day Guan Zhong and Xiao He. I am not as capable as he is." At one point, when Li was set to visit Emperor Taizong at the capital Chang'an, Zhang and two other officials held a feast for Li. Li gave a sword to one of the officials and a jade belt to the other, but gave Zhang nothing. Zhang was surprised and asked Li the reason. Li responded:

There is no fault I find in you. One of them is indecisive, so I gave him a sword to encourage him to be more decisive. The other is careless, and so I gave him a belt to encourage him to rein himself in. Your abilities will mean that you will lack nothing. What can I give you?

Li later recommended Zhang for his talents, and Zhang was made a reserve official at the water bureau of the department of public works. At that time, his older brother Zhang Wencong (張文琮) was serving as the deputy minister of census—and the departments of public works and census were both under the executive bureau of government (尚書省, Shangshu Sheng). According to regulations, brothers were not supposed to serve at the same bureau of government, and so Zhang Wenguan was soon made the magistrate of Yunyang County (雲陽, in modern Xianyang, Shaanxi).

== During Emperor Gaozong's reign ==
Zhang Wenguan later served successively as a mid-level official at both the legislative bureau (西臺, Xi Tai) and the examination bureau (東臺, Dong Tai). As of 667, he was serving at the examination bureau, when Emperor Gaozong gave him the designation of Tong Dong Xi Tai Sanpin (同東西臺三品), making him a chancellor de facto. It was said that at the time, the imperial treasury was getting exhausted as Emperor Gaozong was building several palaces — Penglai Palace (蓬萊宮), Shangyang Palace (上陽宮), and Hebi Palace (合璧宮) — as well as requisitioning a large number of horses for the imperial stable for the purposes of using them for military campaigns. Zhang warned Emperor Gaozong that similar activities by Emperor Yang of Sui led to resentment by the people and Sui's downfall, and Emperor Gaozong, in response, reduced the number of imperial horses by several thousands. In 669, Zhang was promoted to be Dong Tai Shilang (東臺侍郎), the deputy head of the examination bureau, and still a chancellor de facto.

In 672, Zhang was made the chief judge at the supreme court and continued to serve as chancellor as well as a member of the staff of Emperor Gaozong's crown prince Li Hong. It was said that Zhang was efficient and fair at reviewing criminal judgments, quickly ruling on a large number of complex cases. it was further said that those he found guilty had no complaints, and that he was capable of overturning judgments against those who were innocent. When he was ill, the prisoners awaiting review were praying for his health, and he was compared to Dai Zhou, another famed chief judge who served during Emperor Taizong's reign. In 675, he was made Shizhong (侍中), the head of the examination bureau (which by this point had been renamed Menxia Sheng (門下省)) and a post considered one for a chancellor, and also continued to serve on Li Hong's staff as an advisor. It was said that when the prisoners still awaiting review heard that Zhang was no longer chief judge, they wept bitterly. It was further said that at times when he was ill, when the other chancellors reported their suggestions to Emperor Gaozong, Emperor Gaozong would inquire as to whether they had consulted Zhang. If they responded that they had not, he would require them to go to Zhang's mansion to consult him, before ruling on their proposal.

In 678, Zhang was seriously ill. However, when he heard that Emperor Gaozong was contemplating a campaign against Silla, he rode a litter to the palace and spoke to Emperor Gaozong, "At this time, Tufan is invading and we are defending against the invasion. Although Silla is not sufficiently submissive, it is not attacking our borders. If we divide our forces and attack east, I am afraid that neither the government nor the people can withstand the consequences." After this counsel, Emperor Gaozong cancelled plans to attack Silla. Zhang died later that year and was given the posthumous name of Yi (懿, "benevolent"). As he had served on Li Hong's staff, Emperor Gaozong had him buried with honor near the tomb of Li Hong (who had died in 675 and was posthumously honored an emperor).

== Notes and references ==
- Old Book of Tang, vol. 85.
- New Book of Tang, vol. 113.
- Zizhi Tongjian, vols. 201, 202.
