= Jiang Ke =

Tang dynasty official, general and chancellor (died 672)

- Chinese: 姜恪
Transcriptions
Standard Mandarin
- Hanyu Pinyin: Jiāng Kè
- Wade–Giles: Chiang K'o

Duke of Yong'an
- Chinese: 永安公
Transcriptions
Standard Mandarin
- Hanyu Pinyin: Yǒng'ān Gōng
- Wade–Giles: Yung-an Kung

Jiang Ke (died 21 March 672), formally the Duke of Yong'an, was a Chinese military general and politician of the Chinese Tang dynasty, serving as chancellor for several years during the reign of Emperor Gaozong.

== Background ==
Despite Jiang Ke's high status, little is firmly established about his background or career except for the years that he served as chancellor. Unusual for a chancellor, Jiang did not have a biography in either the Old Book of Tang or the New Book of Tang. (Note: See the Table of Contents for the Old Book of Tang and the Table of Contents for the New Book of Tang.) (Note: The table of chancellors' family trees in the New Book of Tang indicated that his father was the general Jiang Baoyi (姜寶誼; died 619), who served during the reign of the founding emperor Emperor Gaozu, but oddly enough did not list him as one of Jiang Baoyi's sons in Jiang Baoyi's biography, as would be customary. Also, he was apparently of the same clan as Shu Han general Jiang Wei. Jiang Baoyi did not have a biography in the Old Book of Tang.) Little is known about Jiang Ke's career prior to his becoming chancellor in 665, although it was noted in the biography of his colleague Yan Liben that he was a renowned general who was promoted for his battlefield achievements. The only real record of his military accomplishment came in 662, when he served as the deputy of the general Qibi Heli (契苾何力) in a campaign to pacify the Tiele tribes (Note: of whom Qibi's own tribe was related) -- a successful one, as Qibi was able to persuade the tribes to give up the chieftains who had rebelled against Tang and to resubmit to Tang.

== Service under Emperor Gaozong ==
In 665, Jiang Ke was serving as the minister of defense, when Emperor Gaozong gave him the additional designation of Tong Dong Xi Tai Sanpin (同東西臺三品), making him a de facto chancellor. On 31 January 669, Jiang was made acting zuoxiang (左相), head of the Eastern Terrace and a default chancellor.

In fall 670, in the aftermath of a major defeat that the generals Xue Rengui and Guo Daifeng (郭待封) suffered at the hands of Tufan's prime minister Gar Trinring Tsendro (Chinese: 論欽陵, Lun Qinling) earlier that year, Emperor Gaozong commissioned Jiang with an army to attack Tufan, but if the army was actually launched, the results were not recorded in history. In 671, he was formally made the head of the Chancellery under the title Palace Attendant. Jiang died in 672 with the title of the Duke of Yong'an (which he apparently inherited from his father Jiang Baoyi), but his posthumous name, if any, was not recorded in history.
