= Lu Dunxin =

Lu Dunxin (陸敦信) was an official of the Chinese Tang dynasty, briefly serving as chancellor during the reign of Emperor Gaozong.

Little is known about Lu Dunxin's career before or after his brief stint as chancellor, as, atypical for a chancellor, he did not have a biography in either the Old Book of Tang or the New Book of Tang. In summer 665, he was described as imperial advisor (右侍極, You Shiji) when he was named acting You Xiang (右相) -- the head of the legislative bureau of government (東臺, Dong Tai) and a post considered one for a chancellor. Almost exactly one year later, in summer 666, Emperor Gaozong accepted his resignation on account of old age and illness, and he was again made imperial advisor, in addition to the principal of the imperial university. There appears to be no historical record of his death.

== Notes and references ==
- Zizhi Tongjian, vol. 201.
