= Chancellor of the Tang dynasty =

Imperial Chinese position

Chancellor
- Chinese: 宰相
Transcriptions
Standard Mandarin
- Hanyu Pinyin: zǎixiàng
- Wade–Giles: tsai-hsiang
Yue: Cantonese
- Jyutping: zoi2 soeng1

The chancellor, also known by its Chinese name as the zaixiang, was a semi-formal designation for a number of high-level officials during China's Tang dynasty. This list also includes chancellors of the short-lived Wu Zhou dynasty, which is often considered an interregnum of the Tang.

== Origins ==
Ouyang Xiu, the author of the New Book of Tang, asserts that the Tang dynasty inherited its bureaucracy from its dynastic predecessor, the Sui, whose founder the Wen Emperor divided his government into five main bureaus (省, shěng):

- The Department of State Affairs (尚書省, Shàngshū Shěng)
- The Chancellery (門下省, Ménxià Shěng)
- The Legislative Bureau (內史省, Nèishǐ Shěng)
- The Palace Library (秘書省, Mìshū Shěng)
- The Eunuch Bureau (initially 內侍省, Nèishì Shěng, but later changed to 殿內省, Diànnèi Shěng by the Yang Emperor)

Under the Wen Emperor, the Department of State Affairs was regarded as the most important. He had his most honored officials such as Gao Jiong, Yang Su, and Su Wei lead it at various points. Its heads—the two shàngshū púshè (尚書僕射)—were generally regarded as the Sui chancellors. Ouyang further asserts, however, that the heads of the Legislative Bureau and Chancellery were also considered chancellors.

== Development ==
Emperor Gaozu, the founder of the Tang dynasty, initially followed the Sui's system of governance including the five-bureau organization. However, he established a single head for the Department of State Affairs, the shàngshūlǐng (尚書令), naming his second son Li Shimin to the post. Li Shimin became emperor in 626 (posthumously remembered as Emperor Taizong) but his former post of shangshuling had to be left vacant because none of his officials dared occupy it. The Department of State Affairs therefore reverted to its previous arrangement of being headed by two vice-directors (or translated to supervisors), the shangshu puye. Around 626, probably by Emperor Taizong's orders, the institution of multiple chancellors was also formalized, treating the office as an additional honorific for the vice-directors of the Department of State Affairs, the palace attendant of the Chancellery, and the director of the Legislative Bureau (中書令, Zhōngshū lǐng), whose Chinese name was changed to the Zhongshu Sheng (中書省). The Chancellery and the Legislative Bureau themselves often had more than one head, so that there were frequently more than four chancellors in any given year. After 705, however, the vice-directors of the Department of State Affairs were no longer considered chancellors by default, although some continued to separately received the status as an additional title.

The Tang government began to designate certain high-level officials as additional chancellors with titles such as the "participator in administrative governance" (參豫朝政, cānyù cháozhèng). These positions were given a formal designation in 643, reckoned "equivalent to the Legislative Bureau and Chancellery third-rank officials" (同中書門下三品, tóng Zhōngshū Ménxià sānpǐn). The 20th-century historian Bo Yang called such officials de facto chancellors. The names of the Legislative Bureau and the Chancellery changed names multiple times, such that the Chinese phrasing of the chancellors "equivalent to the Legislative Bureau and Chancellery third-rank officials" also required frequent adjustment. Under Emperor Xuanzong, when the Legislative Bureau was briefly known as the Zǐwéi Shěng (紫微省) and the Chancellery as the Huángmén Shěng (黃門省), the additional chancellors were known as tóng Zǐwéi Huángmén sānpǐn (同紫微黃門三品). A lesser designation with similar privileges was created in 682 under Emperor Gaozong, initially known as chancellors "equivalent to the Legislative Bureau and Chancellery participators" (同中書門下平章事, tóng Zhōngshū Ménxià píngzhāngshì). These were called de facto chancellors, second grade, by Bo. The last additional chancellor "equivalent to the Legislative Bureau and Chancellery third-rank officials" to be noted as such was Li Lin in the Chinese lunar year spanning late 757 and early 758. Lü Yin was also said to have carried such a title during his term as chancellor from 759 to 760 but he is not noted as such in the table of chancellors provided in the New Book of Tang. Meanwhile, following An Lushan's rebellion, the chancellors "equivalent to the Legislative Bureau and Chancellery participators" became very common.

Until the second reign of Emperor Ruizong began in 710, further variations on the "participator in administrative governance" continued to appear. These titles included the "participator in important matters" (參知機務, canzhi jiwu), the "participator in secret matters" (參掌機密, canzhang jimi), the "participator in governance matters" (參知政事, canzhi zhengshi, and 參謀政事, canmou zhengshi). These were grouped by Bo as de facto chancellors, third class.

== Function ==
Under the Tang, officials designated as chancellors met periodically at the Hall of Matters of Governance (政事堂, Zhengshi Tang), originally located within the Chancellery. In 683, Pei Yan headed both the Chancellery and the Legislative Bureau and moved the hall to the Legislative Bureau. Under Emperor Xuanzong, the chancellor Zhang Shuo changed the hall's name to "Area within the Legislative Bureau" (中書門下, Zhongshu menxia), apparently employing a triple entendre as the terms could also refer to the combination of the Legislative Bureau (Zhongshu Sheng) and the Chancellery (Menxia Sheng), Chinese often employing asyndeton, or to disciples or students of central affairs. Zhang also created five offices under the chancellors to oversee the civil service, state secrets, military matters, governance, and criminal law. Under Emperor Suzong, the chancellors begin to rotate their off days so that at least one would always be on duty, although, when submissions were made to the emperor, they were signed in the names of all the chancellors whether on duty or not. The name of the meeting place also changed back to the Hall of Matters of Governance.

== List ==
These lists includes chancellors of the Wu Zhou dynasty but not various regional governors who were given the titles as honorifics. The chancellors under the pretenders Li Yun and Li Yu, Prince of De are listed, but not the chancellors under the pretender Li Chenghong. Li Chenghong was said to have had multiple chancellors but only Yu Kefeng (于可封) and Huo Huan (霍環)) were named and their specific titles were not given.

=== Heads of the Department of State Affairs ===
The executive bureau had these changes in name:

- Shangshu Sheng (尚書省) (618–662)
- Zhong Tai (中臺) (662–670)
- Shangshu Sheng (670–684)
- Wenchang Tai (文昌臺) (684)
- Wenchang Dusheng (文昌都省) (684–685)
- Wenchang Dutai (文昌都臺) (685–703)
- Zhong Tai (703–705)
- Shangshu Sheng (705–907)

Correspondingly, the heads of the executive bureau, considered chancellors from 618 to 705, had these titles during those periods:

- Shangshu Ling (尚書令) (618–626)
- Shangshu Puye (尚書僕射) (618–662)
- Kuangzheng (匡政) (662–670)
- Shangshu Puye (670–684)
- Wenchang Xiang (文昌相) (684–705)
- Shangshu Puye (705–713)
- Cheng Xiang (丞相) (713–742)
- Shangshu Puye (742–907)

The men who held the office included (including the Shangshu Puye during Emperor Gaozu's reign, even though at that time the office was for the deputy heads of the Shangshu Sheng):

- Li Shimin (as Shangshu Ling 618–626)
- Pei Ji (618–629)
- Xiao Yu (623–626, 627)
- Feng Deyi (626–627)
- Zhangsun Wuji (627–628)
- Fang Xuanling (629–643, 643–648)
- Du Ruhui
  Du Ruhui (629)
- Li Jing (630–634)
- Wen Yanbo (636–637)
- Gao Shilian (638–643)
- Li Shiji (649–650)
- Zhang Xingcheng (651–653)
- Yu Zhining (651–659)
- Chu Suiliang (653–655)
- Liu Rengui (675–681, 683–685)
- Dai Zhide (675–679)
- Su Liangsi (686–690)
- Wei Daijia (686–689)
- Wu Chengsi (690–692)
- Cen Changqian (690–691)
- Doulu Qinwang (697–698, 699–700, 705–706)
- Wang Jishan (699)

After 705, the heads of the executive bureau were no longer considered chancellors unless they received the chancellor-de facto designation.

- Tang Xiujing (705–706)
- Wei Yuanzhong (706–707)
- Li Chengqi (710)
- Li Kuo (763–764) (as Shangshu Ling)
- Guo Ziyi (764) (as Shangshu Ling)
- Li Maozhen (901–903) (as Shangshu Ling)

=== Heads of the Legislative Bureau ===
The leiglsative bureau had these changes in name:

- Neishi Sheng (內史省) (618–620)
- Zhongshu Sheng (中書省) (620–662)
- Xi Tai (西臺) (662–671)
- Zhongshu Sheng (671–684)
- Feng Ge (鳳閣) (684–705)
- Zhongshu Sheng (705–713)
- Ziwei Sheng (紫微省) (713–717)
- Zhongshu Sheng (717–907)

Correspondingly, the heads of the legislative bureau had these titles during those periods:

- Neishi Ling (內史令) (618–620)
- Zhongshu Ling (中書令) (620–662)
- You Xiang (右相) (662–671)
- Zhongshu Ling (671–684)
- Neishi (內史) (684–705)
- Zhongshu Ling (705–713)
- Ziwei Ling (紫微令) (713–717)
- Zhongshu Ling (717–742)
- You Xiang (742–757)
- Zhongshu Ling (757–907)

The men who held the office included:

- Xiao Yu (618–623)
- Dou Wei (618)
- Feng Deyi (620–626)
- Yang Gongren (623–626)
- Li Shimin (625–626)
- Fang Xuanling
  Fang Xuanling (626–629)
- Yuwen Shiji (626–627)
- Li Jing (628–630)
- Wen Yanbo (630–636)
- Yang Shidao (639–643, 645)
- Cen Wenben (644–645)
- Ma Zhou (644–648)
- Zhangsun Wuji (648–649)
- Chu Suiliang (648–650)
- Gao Jifu (649–651)
- Liu Shi (652–654)
- Lai Ji (655–657)
- Cui Dunli (655–656)
- Li Yifu (657–658, 663)
- Du Zhenglun (657–658)
- Xu Jingzong (658–662)
- Liu Xiangdao (664)
- Lu Dunxin (665–666)
- Liu Rengui (666–670)
- Yan Liben (668–673)
- Hao Chujun (675–679)
- Li Jingxuan (676–680)
- Xue Yuanchao (681–683)
- Cui Zhiwen (681–683)
- Pei Yan (683–684)
- Qian Weidao (684–685)
- Pei Judao (685–687)
- Cen Changqian (686–690)
- Xing Wenwei (690)
- Doulu Qinwang (693–694)
- Li Zhaode (694)
- Wang Jishan (697–699)
- Wu Sansi (698–700)
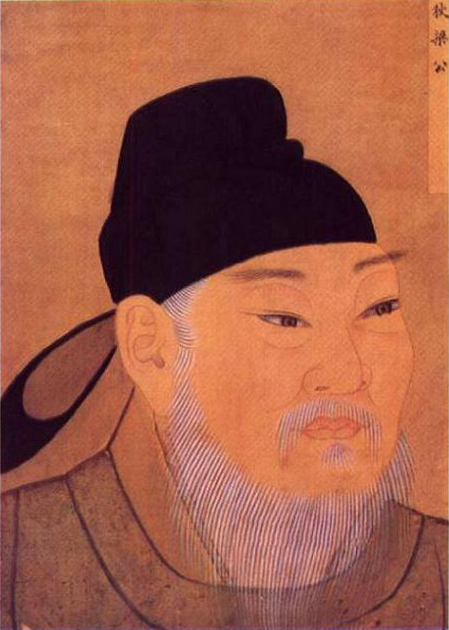
- Di Renjie, chancellor of the Tang dynasty (691–693, 697–700)
  Di Renjie (700)
- Li Jiao (704, 706–709)
- Yang Zaisi (704–705, 705–709)
- Cui Xuanwei (705)
- Yuan Shuji (705)
- Wei Anshi (705–706, 711)
- Wei Yuanzhong (705–706)
- Zong Chuke (709–710)
- Xiao Zhizhong (709–710, 710, 713)
- Zhong Shaojing (710)
- Wei Sili (710)
- Yao Chong (710–711, 713–716)
- Cui Shi (712–713)
- Zhang Shuo (713, 723–726)
- Zhang Jiazhen (720–723)
- Xiao Song (729–733)
- Zhang Jiuling (733–736)
- Li Linfu (736–752)
- Yang Guozhong (752–756)
- Cui Yuan (757–758)
- Li Fuguo (762)
- Li Huaiguang (783–784)
- Li Sheng (784–793)
- Hun Jian (796–799)
- Han Hong (819–822)
- Pei Du (839)
- Bai Minzhong (860–861)
- Wei Zhaodu (888)

=== Heads of the Chancellery ===
The Chancellery had these changes in name:

- Menxia Sheng (門下省) (618–662)
- Dong Tai (東臺) (662–671)
- Menxia Sheng (671–684)
- Luan Tai (鸞臺) (684–705)
- Menxia Sheng (705–713)
- Huangmen Sheng (黃門省) (713–720)
- Menxia Sheng (720–907)

Correspondingly, the heads of the Chancellery had these titles during those periods:

- Nayan (納言) (618–620)
- Shizhong (侍中) (620–662)
- Zuo Xiang (左相) (662–671)
- Shizhong (671–684)
- Nayan (684–705)
- Shizhong (705–713)
- Huangmen Jian (黃門監) (713–720)
- Shizhong (720–742)
- Zuo Xiang (742–757)
- Shizhong (757–907)

The men who held the office included:

- Liu Wenjing (618)
- Dou Kang (618)
- Chen Shuda (618–626)
- Pei Ju (624–625)
- Yuwen Shiji (625–626)
- Li Yuanji (625–626)
- Gao Shilian (626–627)
- Du Ruhui (628–629)
- Wang Gui (628–633)
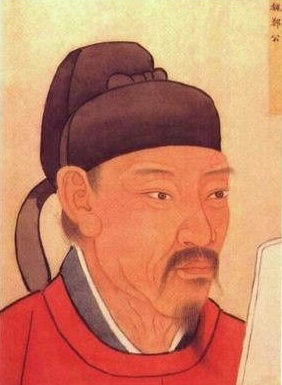
- Wei Zheng
  Wei Zheng (632–636)
- Yang Shidao (636–639)
- Liu Ji (644–645)
- Zhangsun Wuji (645–648)
- Zhang Xingcheng (650–651)
- Gao Jifu (651–654)
- Yuwen Jie (652–653)
- Cui Dunli (653–655)
- Han Yuan (655–657)
- Xu Jingzong (657–658)
- Xin Maojiang (658–659)
- Xu Yushi (659–662)
- Dou Dexuan (664–666)
- Jiang Ke (668–672)
- Zhang Wenguan (675–678)
- Hao Chujun (679–681)
- Pei Yan (681–683)
- Liu Jingxian (683–684)
- Wang Dezhen (684–685)
- Su Liangsi (685–686)
- Wei Siqian (686–687)
- Pei Judao (687–690)
- Wei Xuantong (687–689)
- Zhang Guangfu (689)
- Wu Chengsi (689–690)
- Wu Youning (690–691, 691–692)
- Shi Wuzi (690–691)
- Zong Qinke (690)
- Ouyang Tong (691)
- Yao Shu (694–697)
- Lou Shide (697–699)
- Di Renjie (698–700)
- Li Jiao (703–704)
- Wei Anshi (704–705, 709–710)
- Jing Hui (705)
- Huan Yanfan (705)
- Wei Yuanzhong (705)
- Yang Zaisi (705–707)
- Su Gui (706–707)
- Wei Juyuan (707–709)
- Ji Chuna (707–710)
- Xiao Zhizhong (709)
- Li Rizhi (711)
- Dou Huaizhen (711)
- Liu Youqiu (711–712, 713)
- Cen Xi (712–713)
- Wei Zhigu (713–714)
- Lu Huaishen (714–716)
- Song Jing (716–720)
- Yuan Qianyao (720–729)
- Pei Guangting (730–733)
- Pei Yaoqing (734–736)
- Niu Xianke (738–742)
- Li Shizhi (742–746)
- Chen Xilie (747–754)
- Wei Jiansu (756–757)
- Miao Jinqing (757, 757–763)
- Wang Jin (764)
- Hun Jian (784–796)
- Ma Sui (785–795)
- Wang Duo (881–882)
- Zhu Mei (886)
- Zheng Congdang (886–887)
- Wei Zhaodu (887–888)
- Xu Yanruo (896–900)
- Cui Yin (903–904)

=== De facto chancellors ===
==== Prior to formalization ====
- Du Yan (627–628) (as Canyu Chaozheng (參豫朝政))
- Wei Zheng (629–632 (as Canyu Chaozheng), 636–642 (as Canyi Deshi (參議得失)))
- Xiao Yu (630 (as Canyi Chaozheng (參議朝政)), 635–636 (as Canyu Chaozheng))
- Dai Zhou (630–633) (as Canyu Chaozheng)
- Hou Junji (630–632, 632–643) (as Canyu Chaozheng)
- Li Jing (634) (as Pingzhang Zhengshi (平章政事))
- Liu Ji (639–644) (as Canzhi Zhengshi (參知政事))
- Cen Wenben (642–644) (as Zhuandian Jimi (專典機密))

==== De facto chancellors of the first grade ====
The office was created in 643. The titles, as modified from time to time to reflect the names in changes of the Legislative Bureau and the Chancellery, included:

- Tong Zhongshu Menxia Sanpin (同中書門下三品) (643–662)
- Tong Dong Xi Tai Sanpin (同東西臺三品) (662–672)
- Tong Zhongshu Menxia Sanpin (672–684)
- Tong Fengge Luantai Sanpin (同鳳閣鸞臺三品) (684–705)
- Tong Zhongshu Menxia Sanpin (705–713)
- Tong Ziwei Huangmen Sanpin (同紫微黃門三品) (713–720)
- Tong Zhongshu Menxia Sanpin (720–738)
- Xiao Yu (643–646)
- Li Shiji (643–649, 650–670)
- Gao Shilian (643–647)
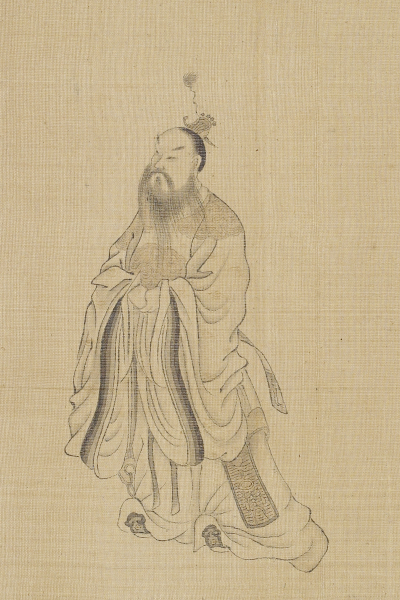
- Zhangsun Wuji
  Zhangsun Wuji (649–659)
- Yuwen Jie (651–652)
- Liu Shi (651–652)
- Gao Jifu (651–653)
- Yu Zhining (651–659)
- Chu Suiliang (652–655)
- Han Yuan (652–655)
- Lai Ji (652–655)
- Du Zhenglun (656–657)
- Cui Dunli (656)
- Xu Yushi (659)
- Ren Yaxiang (659–662)
- Li Yifu (659–662, 662–663)
- Lu Chengqing (659–660)
- Xu Jingzong (662–670)
- Shangguan Yi (662–665)
- Le Yanwei (665)
- Sun Chuyue (665)
- Jiang Ke (665–668)
- Yang Hongwu (667–668)
- Dai Zhide (667–675)
- Li Anqi (667)
- Zhao Renben (667–670)
- Zhang Wenguan (669–678)
- Li Jingxuan (669–670, 670–676)
- Hao Chujun (669–679)
- Liu Rengui (672–675, 681–683)
- Lai Heng (676–678)
- Xue Yuanchao (676–681)
- Li Yiyan (676–683)
- Gao Zhizhou (676–679)
- Zhang Da'an (677–680)
- Wang Dezhen (680)
- Pei Yan (680–681)
- Cui Zhiwen (680–681)
- Cen Changqian (683–686, 690–691)
- Guo Daiju (683–684)
- Wei Xuantong (683–687)
- Wei Hongmin (684)
- Liu Yizhi (684–687)
- Wu Chengsi (684, 685, 690–692, 697)
- Qian Weidao (684–685)
- Wei Siqian (685–686)
- Pei Judao (685)
- Wei Fangzhi (685–690)
- Wei Daijia (685–686)
- Su Liangsi (686–690)
- Wang Benli (689–690)
- Wang Xiaojie (694–696)
- Wu Sansi (697, 705)
- Doulu Qinwang (697–698, 699–700)
- Wu Youning (698–699)
- Wei Yuanzhong (701–703, 705)
- Su Weidao (702–704)
- Li Jiongxiu (702–704)
- Wei Anshi (702–704)
- Wei Sili (704, 709–710)
- Li Jiao (704, 706–707, 709–710)
- Yao Chong (704–705, 710, 713)
- Li Dan (705)
- Zhang Jianzhi (705)
- Yuan Shuji (705)
- Yang Zaisi (705, 709)
- Zhu Qinming (705–706)
- Wei Anshi (705, 711)
- Li Huaiyuan (705–706, 706)
- Tang Xiujing (705, 709–710)
- Wei Juyuan (705, 706–707, 709–710)
- Zong Chuke (707–709)
- Ji Chuna (707)
- Xiao Zhizhong (707–709)
- Zhang Renyuan (708–710)
- Wei Wen (709–710)
- Su Gui (709–710)
- Zhang Xi (710)
- Pei Tan (710)
- Li Longji (710)
- Song Jing (710–711)
- Wei Zhigu (711–712)
- Cui Shi (711–712, 712–713)
- Lu Xiangxian (712–713)
- Dou Huaizhen (712, 712–713)
- Cen Xi (712)
- Liu Youqiu (712, 713)
- Guo Yuanzhen (713)
- Xue Na (714)
- Zhang Shuo (721–723)
- Wang Jun (723)
- Li Linfu (734–736)
- Niu Xianke (736–738)
- Li Lin (757–758)

==== De facto chancellors of the second grade ====
The office was created in 682. The titles, as modified from time to time to reflect the names in changes of the Legislative Bureau and Chancellery, included:

- Tong Zhongshu Menxia Pingzhangshi (同中書門下平章事) (682–684)
- Tong Fengge Luantai Pingzhangshi (同鳳閣鸞臺平章事) (684–705)
- Tong Zhongshu Menxia Pingzhangshi (705–713)
- Tong Ziwei Huangmen Pingzhangshi (同紫微黃門平章事) (713–720)
- Tong Zhongshu Menxia Pingzhangshi (720–907)

It was often referred to in brief as Tong Pingzhangshi (同平章事).

- Guo Daiju (682–683)
- Cen Changqian (682–683)
- Guo Zhengyi (682–683)
- Wei Xuantong (682–683)
- Liu Jingxian (682–683)
- Li Jingchen (684)
- Shen Junliang (684–685)
- Cui Cha (684–685)
- Wei Fangzhi (684–685)
- Zhang Guangfu (687–689)
- Qian Weidao (688)
- Wang Benli (688–689)
- Fan Lübing (689–690)
- Xing Wenwei (689–690)
- Fu Youyi (690–691)
- Le Sihui (691)
- Ren Zhigu (691–692)
- Ge Fuyuan (691)
- Pei Xingben (691–692)
- Di Renjie (691–692, 697–698)
- Yang Zhirou (692)
- Li Youdao (692)
- Yuan Zhihong (692)
- Cui Shenji (692)
- Cui Yuanzong (692–694)
- Li Zhaode (692–694)
- Yao Shu (692)
- Li Yuansu (692, 694–696)
- Wang Xuan (692)
- Lou Shide (693–696, 697)
- Wei Juyuan (693–694)
- Lu Yuanfang (693–694, 699–700)
- Su Weidao (694–694, 698–704)
- Wei Shifang (694)
- Yang Zaisi (694–699)
- Du Jingjian (694, 697–698)
- Zhou Yunyuan (694–695)
- Sun Yuanheng (696–696)
- Wang Fangqing (696–698)
- Li Daoguang (696–698)
- Zong Chuke (697–698, 704)
- Doulu Qinwang (697–698, 705–709)
- Yao Chong (698–704)
- Li Jiao (698–700, 703)
- Ji Xu (699–700)
- Wei Yuanzhong (699–701)
- Wang Jishan (699)
- Zhang Xi (700–701)
- Wei Anshi (700–704)
- Li Huaiyuan (701)
- Gu Cong (701–702)
- Li Jiongxiu (701–702)
- Zhu Jingze (703–704)
- Tang Xiujing (703–705)
- Cui Xuanwei (704–705)
- Zhang Jianzhi (704–705)
- Fang Rong (704–705)
- Wei Chengqing (704–705)
- Yuan Shuji (705)
- Yu Weiqian (706–707)
- Cui Shi (709, 710)
- Zhao Yanzhao (709–710)
- Zheng Yin (709)
- Cen Xi (710)
- Zhang Jiafu (710)
- Guo Yuanzhen (711)
- Zhang Shuo (711)
- Dou Huaizhen (711)
- Lu Xiangxian (711–712)
- Lu Huaishen (713–715)
- Yuan Qianyao (716, 720)
- Su Ting (716–720)
- Zhang Jiazhen (720)
- Li Yuanhong (726–729)
- Du Xian (726–729)
- Xiao Song (728–729)
- Pei Guangting (729–730)
- Yuwen Rong (729)
- Zhang Jiuling (733)
- Han Xiu (733)
- Chen Xilie (746–747)
- Wei Jiansu (754–757)
- Cui Yuan (756–757)
- Fang Guan (756–757)
- Pei Mian (756–757, 769)
- Cui Huan (756–757)
- Li Lin (756–757)
- Zhang Gao (757–758)
- Miao Jinqing (757)
- Wang Yu (758–759)
- Lü Yin (759, 759–760)
- Li Xian (759, 763–764)
- Li Kui (759–761)
- Diwu Qi (759)
- Xiao Hua (761–762)
- Pei Zunqing (761–763)
- Yuan Zai (762–777)
- Liu Yan (763–764)
- Wang Jin (764–777)
- Du Hongjian (764–769)
- Yang Wan (777)
- Chang Gun (777–779)
- Li Zhongchen (779–784)
- Cui Youfu (779–780)
- Qiao Lin (779)
- Yang Yan (779–781)
- Lu Qi (781–783)
- Zhang Yi (781–782)
- Guan Bo (782–784)
- Xiao Fu (783–784)
- Liu Congyi (783–785)
- Jiang Gongfu (783–784)
- Lu Han (784–786)
- Li Mian (784–786)
- Zhang Yanshang (785, 787)
- Liu Zi (786–787)
- Cui Zao (786)
- Qi Ying (786–787)
- Han Huang (786–787)
- Liu Hun (787)
- Li Mi (787–789)
- Dou Can (789–792)
- Dong Jin (789–793)
- Zhao Jing (792–796)
- Lu Zhi (792–794)
- Jia Dan (793–805)
- Lu Mai (793–797)
- Cui Sun (796–803)
- Zhao Zongru (796–798)
- Zheng Yuqing (798–800, 805–806)
- Qi Kang (800–803)
- Du You (803–812)
- Gao Ying (803–805)
- Zheng Xunyu (803–805)
- Wei Zhiyi (805)
- Du Huangchang (805–807)
- Yuan Zi (805)
- Zheng Yin (805–809)
- Wu Yuanheng (807, 813–815)
- Li Jifu (807–808, 811–814)
- Yu Di (808–813)
- Pei Ji (808–810)
- Li Fan (809–811)
- Quan Deyu (810–813)
- Li Jiang (811–814)
- Zhang Hongjing (814–816)
- Wei Guanzhi (814–816)
- Pei Du (815–819, 822, 826–830)
- Li Fengji (816–817, 822–826)
- Wang Ya (816–818, 833–835)
- Cui Qun (817–819)
- Li Yong (817–818)
- Li Yijian (818)
- Huangfu Bo (818–820)
- Cheng Yi (818–819)
- Linghu Chu (819–820)
- Xiao Mian (820–821)
- Duan Wenchang (820–821)
- Cui Zhi (820–822)
- Du Yuanying (821–823)
- Wang Bo (821–822, 827–830)
- Yuan Zhen (822)
- Niu Sengru (823–825, 830–832)
- Li Cheng (824–826)
- Dou Yizhi (824–828)
- Wei Chuhou (826–828)
- Lu Sui (828–835)
- Li Zongmin (829–833, 834–835)
- Song Shenxi (830–831)
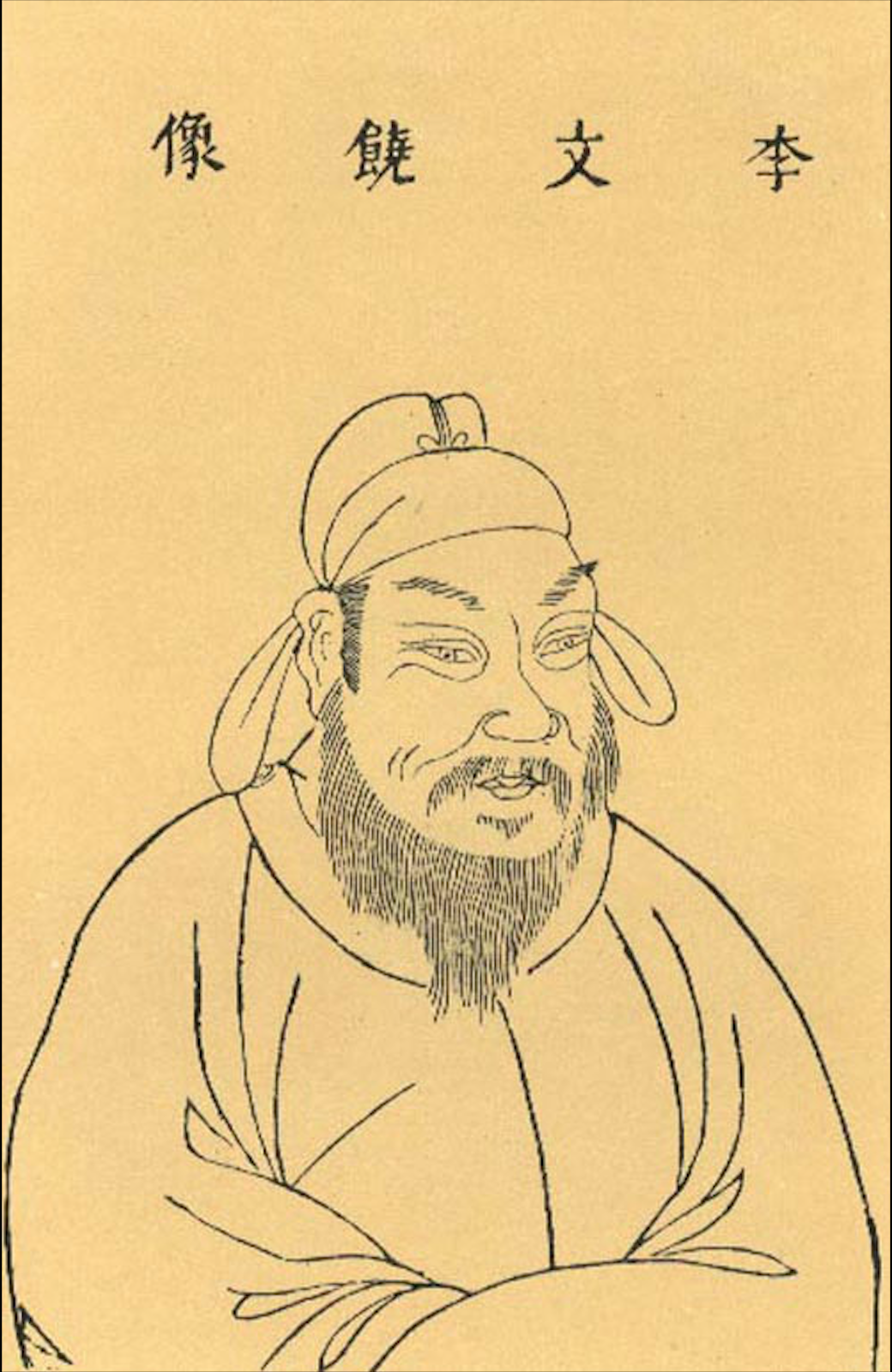
- Li Deyu
  Li Deyu (833–834, 840–846)
- Jia Su (835)
- Li Guyan (835, 836–837)
- Shu Yuanyu (835)
- Li Xun (835)
- Zheng Tan (835–839)
- Li Shi (835–838)
- Chen Yixing (837–839, 841–842)
- Yang Sifu (838–840)
- Li Jue (838–840)
- Cui Dan (839–841)
- Cui Gong (840–843)
- Li Shen (842–844)
- Li Rangyi (842–846)
- Cui Xuan (843–845, 849–855)
- Du Cong (844–845, 861–863)
- Li Hui (Tang dynasty) (845–846)
- Zheng Su (845–846)
- Bai Minzhong (846–851)
- Lu Shang (846–847)
- Cui Yuanshi (847–848)
- Wei Cong (847–848)
- Ma Zhi (848–849)
- Zhou Chi (848–849)
- Wei Fu (849–850)
- Cui Guicong (850–851)
- Linghu Tao (850–859)
- Wei Mo (851–857)
- Pei Xiu (852–856)
- Zheng Lang (856–857)
- Cui Shenyou (856–858)
- Xiao Ye (857–859)
- Liu Zhuan (858)
- Xiahou Zi (858–860, 862–864)
- Jiang Shen (858–862)
- Du Shenquan (859–863)
- Bi Xian (860–863)
- Yang Shou (863–866)
- Cao Que (863–870)
- Xiao Zhi (864–865)
- Lu Yan (864–871)
- Gao Qu (865)
- Xu Shang (865–869)
- Yu Cong (867–872)
- Liu Zhan (869–870, 874)
- Wei Baoheng (870–873)
- Wang Duo (870–873, 877–879)
- Liu Ye (871–874)
- Zhao Yin (872–874)
- Xiao Fang (873–875)
- Pei Tan (874)
- Cui Yanzhao (874–877)
- Zheng Tian (874–878, 882–883)
- Lu Xi (874–878, 879–880)
- Li Wei (875–878)
- Doulu Zhuan (878–880)
- Cui Hang (878–880)
- Zheng Congdang (878–880, 883–886)
- Wang Hui (880–881)
- Pei Che (880–881, 883–887)
- Xiao Gou (881–887)
- Zheng Changtu (886)
- Wei Zhaodu (881–887, 893–895)
- Kong Wei (886–891, 895)
- Du Rangneng (886–893)
- Zhang Jun (887–891)
- Liu Chongwang (889–892)
- Cui Zhaowei (891–895)
- Xu Yanruo (891–893, 894–900)
- Zheng Yanchang (892–894)
- Cui Yin (893–895, 895–896, 896–899, 900–901, 903–904)
- Zheng Qi (894)
- Li Xi (894, 895)
- Lu Xisheng (895)
- Wang Tuan (895–896, 896–900)
- Sun Wo (895–897)
- Lu Yi (896, 899–903)
- Zhu Pu (896–897)
- Cui Yuan (896–900, 904–905)
- Pei Zhi (900–903)
- Wang Pu (901–903)
- Pei Shu (901, 903–905)
- Wei Yifan (902, 902)
- Su Jian (902–903)
- Dugu Sun (903–905)
- Liu Can (904–905)
- Zhang Wenwei (905–907)
- Yang She (905–907)

==== De facto chancellors of the third grade ====
The office recurred as variations of the pre-formalization titles, even after formalization of the de facto chancellor offices of the first and second grades, but did not regularly recur after 713. Liu Youqiu, who held the title as Zhi Junguo Zhongshi, was the last person to hold any variation of the title as chancellor as a regular title, although Pei Du would hold the title of Pingzhang Junguo Zhongshi (平章軍國重事) briefly in 830. Toward the end of the dynasty, Li Zhirou was briefly put temporarily in charge of the Office of the Chancellors in 895 with the designation Quanzhi Zhongshu Shi (權知中書事) and therefore could be regarded as a chancellor as well (and was listed in the table of chancellors in the New Book of Tang); similarly, Lu Guangqi went through two similar titles.

- Zhang Liang (643–646) (as Canyu Chaozheng (參豫朝政))
- Chu Suiliang (644–647, 648) (as Canyu Chaozheng)
- Xu Jingzong (645) (as Tongzhang Jiwu (同掌機務))
- Gao Jifu (645) (as Tongzhang Jiwu)
- Zhang Xingcheng (645) (as Tongzhang Jiwu)
- Cui Renshi (648) (as Canzhi Jiwu (參知機務))
- Li Yifu (655–657) (as Canzhi Zhengshi (參知政事))
- Lu Chengqing (659) (as Canzhi Zhengshi)
- Le Yanwei (665) (as Zhi Junguo Zhengshi (知軍國政事))
- Sun Chuyue (665) (as Zhi Junguo Zhengshi)
- Liu Rengui (665–666) (as Zhi Zhengshi (知政事))
- Zhang Wenguan (667–669) (as Canzhi Zhengshi)
- Li Dan (710) (as Canmou Zhengshi (參謀政事))
- Liu Youqiu (710–711 (as Canyu Jiwu (參豫機務)), 713 (as Zhi Junguo Zhongshi (知軍國重事)))
- Zhong Shaojing (710) (as Canyu Jiwu)
- Xue Ji (710) (as Canyu Jiwu)
- Cui Riyong (710) (as Canyu Jiwu)
- Dou Huaizhen (712) (as Junguo Zhongshi Yigong Pingzhang (軍國重事宜共平章))
- Pei Du (830) (as Pingzhang Junguo Zhongshi)
- Li Zhirou (895) as Quanzhi Zhongshu Shi (權知中書事)
- Lu Guangqi (901 (as Quanju Dang Zhongshu Shi (權句當中書事)), 901–902 (as Canzhi Jiwu))

== See also ==
- Prime Minister of the Imperial Cabinet
- Grand chancellor (China)
