= Yuwen Jie =

Yuwen Jie 宇文節
- Born: Unknown
- Died: Unknown
- Other names: Dali (大禮)
- Occupation: Official

Yuwen Jie (宇文節), courtesy name Dali (大禮), was an official of the Chinese Tang dynasty. He served as chancellor during the reign of Emperor Gaozong.

Yuwen Jie's grandfather Yuwen Bi (宇文弼) was a major general during the Northern Zhou and the Sui dynasty. Not much is known about Yuwen Jie's own early career. At one point during the reign of Emperor Taizong of Tang, he served as a secretary general of the executive bureau of government (尚書省, Shangshu Sheng). He was said to be well-studied in laws and capable in his duties. One time, Emperor Taizong's cousin, the well-known general Li Daozong, had made a private request of him and Yuwen Jie, rather than acquiescing, reported it to Emperor Taizong, who rewarded him with silk.

Emperor Taizong died in 649 and was succeeded by his son Emperor Gaozong. As of 651, Yuwen Jie was Huangmen Shilang (黃門侍郎), the deputy head of the examination bureau of government (門下省, Menxia Sheng), when Emperor Gaozong gave him the designation Tong Zhongshu Menxia Sanpin (同中書門下三品), making him a chancellor de facto. In 652, he became Shizhong, the head of the examination bureau and post considered one for a chancellor.

In winter 652, a plot was discovered centering Emperor Gaozong's sister Princess Gaoyang and her husband Fang Yi'ai (房遺愛). Along with another brother-in-law of Emperor Gaozong's, Chai Lingwu (柴令武), the general Xue Wanche (薛萬徹), and Emperor Gaozong's brother Li Ke, they were accused of plotting to overthrow Emperor Gaozong and replacing him with his uncle Li Yuanjing (李元景) the Prince of Jing. Yuwen Jie was friendly with Fang and tried to assist him, but eventually, all of the major alleged coconspirators were either executed or forced to commit suicide. On account of Yuwen's attempt to help Fang, Yuwen was exiled to Gui Prefecture (桂州, roughly modern Guilin, Guangxi), where he died in exile. His grandson Yuwen Rong eventually served as a chancellor under Emperor Xuanzong.
