= Li Jiongxiu =

Li Jiongxiu (李迥秀), courtesy name Maozhi (茂之), was a Chinese military general and politician of the Tang dynasty and Wu Zetian's Zhou dynasty, serving as chancellor during Wu Zetian's reign.

== Background ==
It is not known when Li Jiongxiu was born, but it is known that his ancestors came from a line that served as officials during Northern Wei, Northern Zhou, and Sui dynasty (Tang dynasty's predecessor); he is a direct descendant of Li Gao. Li Daliang, a famed general during the reigns of Tang's first two emperors Gaozu and Taizong, was a cousin of Li Jiongxiu's grandfather Li Xuanming (李玄明). Both Li Xuanming and Li Jiongxiu's father Li Yiben (李義本) served as prefectural prefects during Tang dynasty, and Li Xuanming carried the title of Duke of Chengji. In his youth, Li Jiongxiu passed the imperial examinations and was made an officer at Xiang Prefecture (相州, in modern Handan, Hebei).

== During Wu Zetian's reign ==
At some point, probably during the reign of Wu Zetian (the wife of Emperor Taizong's son Emperor Gaozong), who had taken the throne in 690 as "emperor" and established her own Zhou dynasty, interrupting Tang, Li Jiongxiu was made a low level official in charge of grading officials' performances. It was said, however, that Wu Zetian favored his talent, and he was given important responsibilities at the ministry of civil service affairs before he was made Fengge Sheren (鳳閣舍人), a mid-level official at the legislative bureau of government (鳳閣, Fengge). It was said that Li Jiongxiu's mother was of low birth but had received Li Yiben's favor on account of her beauty. Li Jiongxiu himself had married a wife of high birth, Lady Cui, but Lady Cui was in the habit of using harsh language against her female servants—which, when Li Jiongxiu's mother heard, hurt her badly as they reminded her of her own sufferings as a servant. When Li Jiongxiu realized this, he divorced Lady Cui. A friend of his asked him, "While your wife was careless with her words, she did not commit any act that would normally call for a divorce. Why do you divorce her?" Li Jiongxiu replied, "Marrying a wife is for the purpose of supporting parents. Now she has offended my mother. How can I keep her?"

As of 697, Li was serving as Fengge Shilang—the deputy head of the legislative bureau—when Wu Zetian gave him an unusual "assignment"—serving as the lover for her lover Zhang Yizhi or Zhang Changzong's mother Lady Zang. In 699, when Wu Zetian established a corps of imperial attendants, with Zhang Yizhi in charge and including such individuals as Zhang Yizhi, Zhang Changzong, Ji Xu, Tian Guidao (田歸道), Xue Ji, and Yuan Banqian (員半千), Li was also named one of the imperial attendants. During this time, he also successively served as minister of civil service affairs (天官尚書, Tianguan Shangshu) and minister of defense (夏官尚書, Xiaguan Shangshu).

In 701, while still serving as minister of defense, Li was given the designation Tong Fengge Luantai Pingzhangshi (同鳳閣鸞臺平章事), making him a chancellor de facto. Wu Zetian, at times, would send ladies in waiting to visit Li's mother to see how she was doing, and at times invited her to the palace. Li was said to be literarily talented, and he often invited guests to his house to feast. It was, however, also said that he associated with Zhang Yizhi and Zhang Changzong and therefore was looked down upon by others.

In 704, the imperial censor Ma Huaisu (馬懷素) accused Li of accepting bribes, and Li was demoted to be the prefect of Lu Prefecture (廬州, roughly modern Hefei, Anhui).

== During Emperor Zhongzong's second reign ==
In 705, Wu Zetian was overthrown in a coup, and Zhang Yizhi and Zhang Changzong were killed. Wu Zetian's son Li Xian the Crown Prince, a former emperor, was restored to the throne (as Emperor Zhongzong). Initially, on account of Li Jiongxiu's association with the Zhangs, he was further demoted to be the secretary general at Heng Prefecture (near modern Hengyang in Hunan). Soon, however, Emperor Zhongzong recalled him to serve as the deputy minister of construction (將作少監, Jiangzuo Shaojian, and he was eventually made the minister of vassal affairs (鴻臚卿) as well as an imperial scholar at Xiuwen Pavilion (脩文館).

== During Emperor Ruizong's second reign and Emperor Xuanzong's reign ==
Emperor Zhongzong died suddenly in 705—a death that traditional historians believed to be a poisoning carried out by his wife Empress Wei and daughter Li Guo'er the Princess Anle. In turn, Empress Wei and Princess Anle were killed in a coup led by Emperor Zhongzong's sister Princess Taiping and nephew Li Longji the Prince of Linzi, who then supported Li Longji's father, Li Dan the Prince of Xiang, himself a former emperor, to be emperor again (as Emperor Ruizong). Li Jiongxiu's responsibilities during the initial stages of Emperor Ruizong's reign were unclear, but it appeared that he was at one point commissioned to command an army either intending to attack or to defend against an attack from Eastern Tujue, and upon his return from that mission, after the chancellor Yao Chong, who was serving as minister of defense as well, was removed in 711, Li Jiongxiu became minister of defense again, but not chancellor. The last historical reference to an act of Li Jiongxiu's was in 713, shortly before Emperor Ruizong passed the throne to Li Longji (as Emperor Xuanzong), when Li Jiongxiu was again put in command of an army either to attack or defend against an attack by Eastern Tujue. It is not known exactly when Li Jiongxiu died, although he was said to die at age 49 and was buried with honor.

== Notes and references ==
- Old Book of Tang, vol. 62.
- New Book of Tang, vol. 99.
- Zizhi Tongjian, vols. 206, 207.
