= Guo Zhengyi =

Chinese politician of the Tang dynasty

Guo Zhengyi (Chinese: 郭正一; died September 10, 689) was a Chinese politician of the Tang dynasty of China, serving as a chancellor during the reign of Emperor Gaozong and the regency of Emperor Gaozong's wife Empress Wu over their son Emperor Zhongzong.

== Background ==
It is not known when Guo Zhengyi was born. He was from Ding Prefecture (定州, roughly modern Baoding, Hebei). He passed the imperial examination during the reign of Emperor Taizong, and subsequently served as a mid-level official at the legislative bureau of government (中書省, Zhongshu Sheng), as well as an imperial scholar.

== During Emperor Gaozong's reign ==
In 678, Tang forces commanded by the chancellor Li Jingxuan, suffered a major defeat at the hands of Tufan's general Gar Trinring Tsendro ("Lun Qinling" (論欽陵) in Chinese), and the major general Liu Shenli (劉審禮) was captured. In light of this major defeat, Emperor Gaozong asked his officials for the proper response against Tufan. Guo Zhengyi advocated going on the defensive for several years while regathering the people's strength, a proposal concurred in by other officials Liu Jingxian and Huangfu Wenliang (皇甫文亮), and Emperor Gaozong accepted the proposal.

In 681, Guo was made the Mishu Shaojian (秘書少監), deputy head of the archival bureau as well as acting Zhongshu Shilang (中書侍郎), the deputy head of the legislative bureau. In 682, he was given the designation Tong Zhongshu Menxia Pingzhangshi (同中書門下平章事), making him a chancellor de facto. It was said that because Guo had been at the legislative bureau for a long period and was familiar with how it was run, most of the edicts were drafted by him, and he was considered capable in this. In 683, when Emperor Gaozong became seriously ill, he had Guo, along with Pei Yan and Liu, assist his crown prince Li Zhe in handling important matters of state.

== During Empress Dowager Wu's regency ==
Emperor Gaozong died in late 683 and was succeeded by Li Zhe (as Emperor Zhongzong), but Emperor Gaozong's powerful wife Empress Wu served as regent and empress dowager. Soon after Emperor Zhongzong's ascension, around the new year 684, she made Guo Zhengyi the principal of the imperial university, no longer a chancellor. Just a short time thereafter, Emperor Zhongzong, who displayed signs of independence, was deposed by Empress Dowager Wu and replaced by his brother Li Dan the Prince of Yu (as Emperor Ruizong).

For the next few years, Guo was moved between several positions—first as the prefect of Jin Prefecture (晉州, roughly modern Linfen, Shanxi), then the deputy head of the archival bureau (by this time known as Lintai Jian (麟臺監)), then acting prefect of Shan Prefecture (陝州, roughly modern Sanmenxia, Henan). He was serving as the prefect of Shan Prefecture as of 689, when Xu Jingzhen (徐敬真), the brother of Xu Jingye the Duke of Ying, who had led an unsuccessful rebellion against Empress Dowager Wu in 684, was captured after spending several years in hiding. During the interrogation of Xu Jingzhen and Zhang Siming (張嗣明), a county magistrate who had assisted Xu Jingzhen in his years of hiding, Xu and Zhang implicated a large number of officials—hoping that by doing so, they would be spared. Among those who were implicated were Guo, along with other key officials Zhang Guangfu, Zhang Chujin (張楚金), Yuan Wanqing (元萬頃), and Wei Yuanzhong. Zhang Guangfu was executed, but Guo, Zhang Chujin, Yuan, and Wei were spared and exiled to the Lingnan region. Guo, however, died while on the way to exile or in exile, and his assets were confiscated.

== Notes and references ==
- Old Book of Tang, vol. 190.2.
- New Book of Tang, vol. 106.
- Zizhi Tongjian, vols. 203, 204.
