= Wei Xuantong =

Wei Xuantong (魏玄同; 617 – November 2, 689), courtesy name Hechu (和初), was a Chinese politician during the Tang dynasty, serving as chancellor during the reign of Emperor Gaozong dominated by Empress Wu, And later alone the regency of his wife Empress Wu (later known as Wu Zetian) over their sons Emperor Zhongzong and Emperor Ruizong. During Emperor Gaozong's reign, he had drawn hatred from the official Zhou Xing as the conveyor of the bad news that Zhou was not getting promoted, and in 689, Zhou, having by that point become one of Empress Dowager Wu's trusted secret police officials, falsely accused Wei of opposing Empress Dowager Wu. She forced Wei to commit suicide.

== Background ==
Wei Xuantong was born in 617, near the end of the Tang dynasty's predecessor, the Sui dynasty. He was from what would eventually become Ding Prefecture (定州, roughly modern Baoding, Hebei), and his grandfather Wei Shikuo (魏士廓) had served as a general for Northern Qi.

== During Emperor Gaozong's reign ==
Wei Xuantong himself had passed the imperial examination, and thereafter became the magistrate of Chang'an County, one of the two counties making up Tang's capital Chang'an. By 664, he was serving as the director of performance reviews at the ministry of civil service, when, on account of his friendship with the chancellor Shangguan Yi, who had been executed after unsuccessfully trying to persuade Emperor Gaozong to depose his powerful wife Empress Wu (later known as Wu Zetian), Wei was exiled to the Lingnan region. It was said that during his exile, he was not particularly interested in returning to politics, and he spent most of his days hunting.

Early in Emperor Gaozong's Shangyuan era (674–676), there was a general pardon, and Wei was recalled to the capital. Liu Shenli (劉審禮) the minister of public works was aware of Wei's talent, and he recommended Wei. Wei was subsequently made the secretary general of Qi Prefecture (岐州, roughly modern Baoji, Shaanxi), and then the deputy minister of civil service. In 682, he was given the designation Tong Zhongshu Menxia Pingzhangshi (同中書門下平章事), making him a chancellor de facto. He was also created the Baron of Julu.

Around this time, Wei also submitted a lengthy petition to Emperor Gaozong, advocating a major reform of the civil service system. In his petition, he pointed out that during the Zhou dynasty and Han dynasty, the responsibilities for recommending, promoting, and evaluating officials were split between various central government officials and local officials, and that only during Cao Wei and Jin dynasty (266–420) did the responsibilities began to be concentrated in a single ministry of civil service—a system that he found faulty in that it required a small number of officials to make snap judgment as to the merits of the officials for the entire state, and therefore, even if the officials were capable and honest, they would not be able to make correct decisions all the time—and that the system was open to manipulation through corruption or incompetence. Emperor Gaozong did not take action on his petition.

It was also around this time that Wei would bring an enmity against him that would eventually be his undoing. At this time, Zhou Xing, the magistrate of Heyang County (河陽, in modern Jiaozuo, Henan), had become known for his abilities, and was summoned to the capital, as Emperor Gaozong was considering promoting him. However, someone submitted a letter to Emperor Gaozong, pointing out that Zhou had not passed imperial examinations, and Emperor Gaozong changed his idea about promoting Zhou. However, Zhou was not aware of this, and he repeatedly visited the government officials, awaiting a promotion. The chancellors said nothing to him, but eventually Wei told him, "Magistrate Zhou, you may go." Zhou thereafter believed that Wei was the one who blocked his promotion, and hated Wei immensely.

== During Empress Dowager Wu's regency ==
In 683, Emperor Gaozong died and was succeeded by his son Li Zhe (as Emperor Zhongzong), but in early 684, after Emperor Zhongzong displayed signs of independence, Empress Wu (by this point empress dowager and regent) deposed Emperor Zhongzong and replaced him with his brother Li Dan the Prince of Yu (as Emperor Ruizong), but thereafter held onto power even more tightly.

Meanwhile, Wei Xuantong continued to serve as chancellor. By 685, he was serving as one of the secretaries general for the executive bureau of government (文昌臺, Wenchang Tai), when he was made Luantai Shilang (鸞臺侍郎), the deputy head of the examination bureau (鸞臺, Luan Tai), and he was given a more honored designation as chancellor de facto, Tong Fengge Luantai Sanpin (同鳳閣鸞臺三品). In 687, he became acting Nayan (納言), the head of the examination bureau and a post considered one for a chancellor and made the official in charge of Chang'an (as Empress Dowager had, by this point, effectively moved the capital to the eastern capital Luoyang).

By 689, Zhou Xing had become a powerful official—as he had been in charge of many politically charged investigations carried out against officials and nobles under Empress Dowager Wu's direction. He still resented Wei for what he thought was Wei's role in blocking his promotion. Wei had been great friends with fellow chancellor Pei Yan, who was executed in 684 for what Empress Dowager Wu saw as opposition against her (i.e., Pei's advocacy that she return imperial powers to Emperor Ruizong). Zhou, knowing this, falsely accused Wei of having said, "The empress dowager is old. It is better to support the emperor, for he will last longer." This angered Empress Dowager Wu, and she ordered that Wei commit suicide, and she sent the assistant imperial censor Fang Ji (房濟) to monitor his suicide. When Fang got to Wei's mansion, he said to Wei, "Honored old man, why do you not pretend to be making a secret accusation? That way, the empress dowager will summon you to her presence, and when she does, you can explain that the accusation against you is false." Wei sighed and responded, "What is the difference between being killed by men and being killed by ghosts [(i.e., natural death)]? How can I be an accuser?" He later committed suicide.

== Notes and references ==
- Old Book of Tang, vol. 87.
- New Book of Tang, vol. 117.
- Zizhi Tongjian, vols. 203, 204.
