= Wei Fangzhi =

Chinese chancellor (?–690)

Wei Fangzhi (Chinese: 韋方質; died November 30, 690), formally the Duke of Fuyang (扶陽公), was an official of the Chinese Tang dynasty who served as chancellor during the first reign of Emperor Ruizong.

== Background ==
Wei Fangzhi's grandfather Wei Yunqi (韋雲起) had served as an official both during the early Tang dynasty and Tang's predecessor Sui dynasty, but was killed in 626 shortly after the coup known as the Incident at Xuanwu Gate—as his superior Dou Gui (竇軌), with whom he had a poor relationship, suspected him of being an associate of Li Jiancheng the Crown Prince, who had been killed during the incident by his brother Li Shimin the Prince of Qin (the later Emperor Taizong and grandfather of Emperor Ruizong). Wei Fangzhi's father Wei Shishi (韋師實) subsequently served as a Tang official as well, and by the time of Emperor Ruizong's first reign was prefect of Hua Prefecture (華州, roughly modern Weinan, Shaanxi) and deputy head of the household of the crown prince Li Chengqi, with the title of Duke of Fuyang.

== Service as chancellor during Empress Dowager's Wu regency ==
Little is known about the early part of Wei Fangzhi's own career. By 684, he was serving as Luantai Shilang (鸞臺侍郎), the deputy head of the examination bureau of government (鸞臺, Luantai), when Emperor Ruizong's powerful mother and regent Empress Dowager Wu (later known during her own reign as Wu Zetian) moved him to the post of Fengge Shilang (鳳閣侍郎), the deputy head of the legislative bureau (鳳閣, Fenge) and also gave him the designation of Tong Fengge Luantai Pinzhangshi (同鳳閣鸞臺平章事), making him a chancellor de facto. In 685, she gave him the more honorific designation of Tong Fenge Luantai Sanpin (同鳳閣鸞臺三品).

Wei Fangzhi served as chancellor for the next several years, but his acts were largely unrecorded in history. An exception was in 687, when Empress Dowager Wu wanted to commission his fellow chancellor Wei Daijia to attack Tufan. Wei Fangzhi, pursuant to the usual protocol, requested that a censor be made the auditor for the campaign. Empress Dowager Wu, however, rejected his request, pointing out that an auditor often served to interfere with the authority of the commanding general, and therefore did not commission an auditor for the campaign. It was also recorded that around that time, Empress Dowager Wu had a large body of administrative regulations drafted, known as the Chuigong Regulations (垂拱格, Chuigong being the era name at that time), and that Wei Fangzhi was instrumental in editing the regulations to make them appropriate and was praised for it.

By spring 690, Empress Dowager Wu's nephews Wu Chengsi and Wu Sansi had become very powerful, and even the chancellors had to bow to them. When Wei Fangzhi suffered an illness that year, Wu Chengsi and Wu Sansi went to visit him, but Wei lay on his bed and did not answer their greetings. When someone warned him that not doing so risked offending them, he responded, "Life and death are all determined by heaven. How can a real man prostrate himself to flatter imperial relatives just to avoid disaster?" Soon, Wei was falsely accused by Empress Dowager Wu's trusted secret police official Zhou Xing, and he was exiled to Dan Prefecture (儋州, roughly modern Danzhou, Hainan), and his assets were seized. Later that year, after Empress Dowager Wu had taken the throne from Emperor Ruizong and become "emperor" of her own Zhou dynasty, Wei was executed in exile. Only after Wu Zetian herself was overthrown in 710 and replaced by Emperor Ruizong's brother Emperor Zhongzong were Wei's honors posthumously restored.

== Notes and references ==
- Old Book of Tang, vol. 75.
- New Book of Tang, vol. 103.
- Zizhi Tongjian, vols. 203, 204.
