= Wang Benli =

Chinese military general and politician during the Tang dynasty

Wang Benli (王本立) (died 4 February 690) was a Chinese military general and politician during the Tang dynasty, serving as chancellor during the first reign of Emperor Ruizong.

== Background ==
Little is known about Wang Benli's career before his brief stint as chancellor; atypical for a chancellor, he did not have a biography in either the Old Book of Tang or the New Book of Tang. Further, it is not known where his family was from, as he was not listed among any branch of the Wang clan in the table of chancellors' family trees. The first reference to him in historical accounts was in 679, when he was serving as a secretary at the executive bureau of government (尚書省, Shangshu Sheng). He was said to be favored by Emperor Gaozong and, on account of that favor, was committing many illegal deeds and intimidating other officials. The censor, Di Renjie, accused him of crimes, and initially, Emperor Gaozong was set to pardon him. At Di's insistence—pointing out that the empire did not lack people with Wang's talent—Emperor Gaozong relented and allowed Wang to be punished.

By 683, Wang was serving as the commandant at Sheng Prefecture (勝州, in modern Hohhot, Inner Mongolia), when Eastern Tujue's khan Ashina Gudulu attacked the nearby Chanyu Protector General headquarters (單于總督府, also in modern Hohhot), capturing and killing the official Zhang Xingshi (張行師). Emperor Gaozong sent Wang, along with Li Chongyi (李崇義) the commandant at Xia Prefecture (夏州, roughly modern Yulin, Shaanxi), to defend against the Eastern Tujue attack, but historical accounts did not indicate what the results were.

== During Empress dowager's Wu regency ==
Emperor Gaozong died later in 683 and was succeeded by his son Li Zhe the Crown Prince (as Emperor Zhongzong), but Emperor Gaozong's powerful wife Empress Wu (later known as Wu Zetian) retained actual power as empress dowager and regent. In spring 684, after he showed signs of independence, she deposed him and replaced him with his younger brother Li Dan the Prince of Yu (as Emperor Ruizong), but thereafter wielded power even more firmly. In 687, when her trusted advisor, the chancellor Liu Yizhi was accused of accepting bribes from the Khitan chieftain Sun Wanrong and conducting an affair with a concubine of the deceased chancellor Xu Jingzong. (Historical accounts imply heavily that the real reason why Liu was accused was because Empress Dowager Wu had received reports that he favored that she return imperial authority to Emperor Ruizong, which she saw as a betrayal.) Empress Dowager Wu ordered Wang Benli, who was then serving as the prefect of Su Prefecture (肅州, roughly modern Jiuquan, Gansu), to investigate. When Wang went to Liu's mansion to read Empress Dowager Wu's edict to Liu, Liu responded, "How can it be called an edict if it was not issued through the legislative and examination bureaus?" When Wang reported this comment back to Empress Dowager Wu, she became incensed and ordered Liu to commit suicide.

By 688, Wang was serving as the deputy minister of defense (夏官侍郎, Xiaguan Shilang), when he was given the designation Tong Fengge Luantai Pingzhangshi (同鳳閣鸞臺平章事), making him a chancellor de facto. In 689, his chancellor designation was elevated to the more honored Tong Fengge Luantai Sanpin (同鳳閣鸞臺三品). By spring 690, he was referred to as chancellor and imperial censor reviewing central government affairs (左肅政大夫, Zuo Suzheng Daifu), when he was removed as a chancellor and made the minister of treasury (地官尚書, Diguan Shangsu). He died one month later—with the Zizhi Tongjian not giving a cause for his death, but the chronology of Empress Dowager Wu's regency and reign in the New Book of Tang indicating that he was executed.

== Notes and references ==
- Zizhi Tongjian, vols. 202, 203, 204.
