= Pei Judao =

Pei Judao (裴居道; died July 22, 690) was a general and official of the Chinese Tang dynasty, serving as a chancellor during the first reign of Emperor Ruizong.

== Background ==
It is not known when Pei Judao was born, but it is known his family was from Jiang Prefecture (絳州, part of modern Yuncheng, Shanxi). His grandfather Pei Jingmin (裴鏡民) served as the minister of defense during the Sui dynasty, and his father Pei Xizai (裴熙載) served as a secretary general of the executive bureau of government (尚書省, Shangshu Sheng).

Little is known about most of Pei Judao's career, other than that, at one point during the reign of Emperor Gaozong, he served as a general commanding the imperial guards, and that Emperor Gaozong took his daughter to be the wife of Emperor Gaozong's crown prince Li Hong.

== During Empress dowager's Wu regency ==
As of 685, during the reign of Emperor Gaozong's son Emperor Ruizong (Li Hong's younger brother), Pei Judao was serving as the minister of justice, when Emperor Ruizong's (and Li Hong's) mother, the regent Empress Dowager Wu (later known as Wu Zetian) gave Pei the designation of Tong Fengge Luantai Sanpin (同鳳閣鸞臺三品), making him a chancellor de facto. Later that year, he was made Neishi (內史)—the head of the legislative bureau of government (鳳閣, Fengge) and a post considered one for a chancellor. In 687, he was made Nayan (納言)—the head of the examination bureau of government (鸞臺, Luantai), also a post considered one for a chancellor. Around the new year 689, Empress Dowager Wu, who had by that point taken up permanent residence in the eastern capital Luoyang, made Pei the official in charge of the capital Chang'an. Sometime during his service as chancellor, she created him the Duke of Yi.

In 690, just prior to Empress Dowager Wu taking the throne herself from Emperor Ruizong as the "emperor" of her own Zhou dynasty, interrupting the Tang dynasty, she executed a number of officials and Tang imperial clan members, including Pei. For reasons lost to history, Pei was accused by secret police and imprisoned, finally executed.

== Notes and references ==
- Old Book of Tang, vol. 86.
- New Book of Tang, vol. 81.
- Zizhi Tongjian, vols. 203, 204.
