= Yang Hongwu =

Yang Hongwu (楊弘武; died June 12, 668) was an official of the Chinese Tang dynasty, serving as a chancellor during the reign of Emperor Gaozong.

== Background ==
It is not known when Yang Hongwu was born—other than that it must have been before or not much later than the death of his father Yang Yue (楊岳) in 613. Yang Yue was a younger brother of the Sui dynasty chancellor Yang Su the Duke of Yue. During the reign of Emperor Yang of Sui, Yang Yue served as the magistrate of Wannian County (萬年, one of the two counties forming the capital Chang'an). After Yang Su's death in 604, Yang Yue had a poor relationship with Yang Su's son Yang Xuangan, and secretly submitted a petition to Emperor Yang stating that one day Yang Xuangan will surely rebel. When Yang Xuangan did rebel in 613, Yang Yue, as Yang Xuangan's uncle, was arrested at Chang'an. Emperor Yang, who was in the eastern capital of Luoyang, sent an imperial messenger to order Yang Yue released, but by the time the messenger reached Chang'an, the officials in charge of Chang'an had already killed Yang Yue. However, because of this, Yang Yue's sons, including Yang Hongwu and at least one brother, Yang Hongli (楊弘禮), were spared. After the general Emperor Gaozu rebelled against Sui rule in 617 and eventually established the Tang dynasty in 618, Yang Hongwu became an imperial guard commander.

== During Emperor Gaozong's reign ==
During the Yonghui era of the reign of Emperor Gaozu's grandson Emperor Gaozong (650–655), Yang Hongwu served as a mid-low-level official at the ministry of civil service. After Emperor Gaozong's son Li Hong was created crown prince in 656, Yang became a member of his staff. By 665, though, when Emperor Gaozong was preparing to offer sacrifices to heaven and earth at Mount Tai, Yang was serving as the military advisor to the prefect of Jing Prefecture (荊州, roughly modern Jingzhou, Hubei). During the preparations for the ceremony, Emperor Gaozong promoted Yang to be the deputy minister of defense, and after the ceremony was held in 666, Yang accompanied Emperor Gaozong back to Chang'an, and even though he was no longer at the ministry of civil service, Emperor Gaozong made him participate in assisting the ministry of civil service in selecting officials of the fifth rank and above—mid-to-high level officials, and it was said that thereafter he became increasingly trusted by Emperor Gaozong. Further, Lady Yang, the mother of Emperor Gaozong's powerful wife Empress Wu (later known as Wu Zetian), the Lady of Rong, was also named Yang, and therefore praised and recommended Yang Hongwu. He was therefore soon promoted to be Xi Tai Shilang (西臺侍郎), the deputy head of the examination bureau of government (西臺, Xi Tai). On one occasion, when Emperor Gaozong asked him, "When you were at the ministry of defense, it appeared that the people you recommended were not talented. How could this happen?" Yang responded, "My wife is fierce, and I was only following her will." In doing so, he was satirizing Emperor Gaozong for often following the will of Empress Wu, and Emperor Gaozong realized this, but laughed it off.

In 667, Yang was given the designation of Tong Dong Xi Tai Sanpin (同東西臺三品), making him a chancellor de facto. It was said that Yang Hongwu was not talented as a chancellor, but was known for being humble and careful, as well as being simple in his actions. He died in summer 668 and was buried with honor, with the posthumous name of Gong (恭, "respectful").

== Notes and references ==
- Old Book of Tang, vol. 77.
- New Book of Tang, vol. 106.
- Zizhi Tongjian, vol. 201.
