= Liu Xiangdao =

Liu Xiangdao (劉祥道) (596–666), courtesy name Tongshou (同壽), formally Duke Xuan of Guangping (廣平宣公), was a Chinese politician of the medieval Chinese Tang dynasty who served briefly as chancellor during the reign of Emperor Gaozong.

== Background ==
Liu Xiangdao's family was from what would become Wei Prefecture (魏州, part of modern Handan, Hebei), and claimed ancestry from Liu Pengzu (劉彭祖), a son of Emperor Jing of Han. His father Liu Linfu (劉林甫) served as a mid-level official in the administrations of Tang's founder Emperor Gaozu and Emperor Taizong, and carried the title of Baron of Leping. Liu Linfu died in 629, and Liu Xiangdao inherited the title.

== During Emperor Gaozong's reign ==
The historical records give little information on the early parts of Liu Xiangdao's career. Early in the reign of Emperor Taizong's son and successor Emperor Gaozong, Liu Xiangdao served successively as assistant to the head of the legislative bureau of government (中書省, Zhongshu Sheng), assistant imperial censor, and assistant minister of civil service affairs, all mid-level posts in the imperial administration. In 657, he was made assistant to the head of the examination bureau (門下省, Menxia Sheng), but continued to be responsible for civil service affairs. As he saw faults in the civil service selection process, he submitted a petition to Emperor Gaozong to request changes, and in the excerpts quoted by the Old Book of Tang, he raised six points—that the civil selection process was selecting too many people who were not virtuous; that the people chosen were simply too numerous; that there was insufficient attention paid to selecting diligent students of Confucianism; that awards should be given to people who recommended new talent; that the officials should be given longer office terms so that they would have time to carry out their plans; and that as it currently student, the prominent clans' members were declining important secretarial posts, which they viewed to be below their social station, when such posts were actually quite important in efficient imperial government. Emperor Gaozong apparently initially took no action on this petition, but when the chancellor Du Zhenglun expressed similar sentiments in 658, he had Du and Liu draft proposals for revising the civil service system, but there were many oppositions to their suggestions from established officials, and the recommendations were not acted upon. Later that year, on account of Liu's participation in revising the regulations on imperial ceremonies, his title was upgraded to Marquess of Yangcheng.

In 659, Liu was made the minister of justice. It was said that whenever he dealt with serious cases, he carefully deliberated with a heavy heart, and whenever he submitted recommendations of execution to the emperor, he would fast on that day. In 661, he took the additional post of prefect of Pu Prefecture (蒲州, roughly modern Yuncheng, Shanxi). In 663, that prefectural post was changed to that of secretary general of the capital prefecture Yong Prefecture (雍州, roughly modern Xi'an, Shaanxi), a very important post as the prefect of the capital prefecture was traditionally a post given to one of the most honored imperial princes, and therefore secretary general was actually the official in charge of the capital. Also that year, he was in charge of the corruption investigation against the powerful chancellor Li Yifu. In 664, he was made You Xiang (右相), the head of the legislative bureau—a post considered one for a chancellor. Around the new year 665, when fellow chancellor Shangguan Yi failed in his bid to persuade Emperor Gaozong to depose his second wife Empress Wu (later known as Wu Zetian), Empress Wu had her ally Xu Jingzong falsely accuse Shangguan of treason and had Shangguan executed. As Liu and Shangguan were friends, he was removed from his chancellor post and made the minister of rites.

In 665, when Emperor Gaozong was preparing to make sacrifices to heaven and earth at Mount Tai, the officials in charge generally opined that, based on regulations written during the Han dynasty, the two officials who should sacrifice after Emperor Gaozong were the ministers of ceremonies (太常卿, Taichang Qing) and palace supplies (光祿卿, Guanglu Qing)—two titles that carried far more prestige and importance in the Han dynasty than they did in the Tang dynasty. Liu rebutted their recommendations, pointing out the absurdity of adopting Han regulations that were written for a different structure of government. Emperor Gaozong agreed, and instead, he had his uncle Li Yuanli (李元禮) the Prince of Xu sacrifice after himself, and had Liu sacrifice after Li Yuanli. After the completion of the ceremony (which was held in 666), Emperor Gaozong created Liu the Duke of Guangping. Later that year, Liu requested that he be allowed to retire, and Emperor Gaozong allowed him to retire and bestowed on him the honorific title of Zijin Guanglu Daifu (紫金光祿大夫). He died later that year, and his son Liu Qixian (who later changed his name to Liu Jingxian to observe naming taboo as to Emperor Gaozong's crown prince Li Xian) inherited his title.

== Notes and references ==
- Old Book of Tang, vol. 81.
- New Book of Tang, vol. vol. 106.
- Zizhi Tongjian, vols. 200, 201.
