= Wang Dezhen =

Wang Dezhen (王德真) was an official of the Chinese Tang dynasty, briefly serving as a chancellor on two occasions—once during the reign of Emperor Gaozong, and once during the first reign of Emperor Ruizong, when Emperor Gaozong's wife Empress Wu (later known as Wu Zetian) served as empress dowager and regent.

== Background ==
Despite Wang's high status, little is firmly established about his background or career except for the years that he served as chancellor — as, unusual for a chancellor, he did not have a biography in either the Old Book of Tang or the New Book of Tang. According to the table of chancellors in the New Book of Tang, his father was Wang Wuxuan (王武宣), who at one point served as the prefect of Yue Prefecture (岳州, roughly modern Yueyang, Hunan).

== During Emperor Gaozong's reign ==
As of summer 680, during Emperor Gaozong's reign, Wang Dezhen was serving as Zhongshu Shilang (中書侍郎), the deputy head of the legislative bureau of government (中書省, Zhongshu Sheng), when he was given the designation of Tong Zhongshu Menxia Sanpin (同中書門下三品), making him a chancellor de facto. Five months later, however, without any reason given in the currently extant historical records, he was made the secretary general for Emperor Gaozong's son Li Dan (the later Emperor Ruizong) the Prince of Yu, and was no longer chancellor.

== During Empress Dowager Wu's regency ==
As of 684, Wang was still serving as the secretary general for Li Dan, as well as the minister of rites, when Li Dan's older brother Li Zhe, who had succeeded Emperor Gaozong after Emperor Gaozong's death in late 83 (as Emperor Zhongzong), was deposed by Empress Dowager Wu. She made Li Dan the new emperor (as Emperor Ruizong), and subsequently made Wang Palace Attendant, the head of the Chancellery and a default chancellor. In 685, however, for reasons lost to history, Wang was demoted to the post of prefect of Tong Prefecture (同州, roughly modern Weinan, Shaanxi) — but on the same day, was then further exiled to Xiang Prefecture (象州, roughly modern Laibin, Guangxi). Nothing further was recorded about him, although the table of chancellors in the New Book of Tang indicated that his son Wang Jiusi (王九思) later served as a county magistrate, as did his grandson Wang Qian (王濳).
