= Du Zhenglun =

Chinese politician of the Sui dynasty and Tang dynasty

Du Zhenglun Duke of Xiangyang (襄陽公)
- 杜正倫

Chancellor of the Tang dynasty
- In office 656–658
- Monarch: Emperor Gaozong of Tang

Personal details
- Born: Unknown
- Died: c. 658 Heng Prefecture (modern Nanning, Guangxi, China)
- Occupation: Official
- Known for: Serving as chancellor under Emperor Gaozong; known for literary talent and political integrity

Du Zhenglun (Chinese: 杜正倫) (died 658?) was a Chinese politician of the Chinese Sui dynasty and Tang dynasties, serving as chancellor during the reign of Emperor Gaozong of Tang.

== During the Sui dynasty ==
It is not known when Du Zhenglun was born, but it is known that he was from what would eventually become Xiang Prefecture (相州, in modern Handan, Hebei). During the Renshou era (601–604) of the Sui dynasty's founding emperor Emperor Wen, Du Zhenglun and his older brothers Du Zhengxuan (杜正玄) and Du Zhengzang (杜正藏) all passed the imperial examination. As Sui dynasty imperial examinations were considered unusually difficult—with only 10-odd examinees passing each year—the Du household received great acclaim for having three brothers who did so. It was said that Du Zhenglun was capable in literature, particularly in explaining meanings of passages. He later served as a military officer in the Sui imperial government.

== During Emperor Gaozu's reign ==
During the reign of the Tang dynasty's founder, Emperor Gaozu, Du Zhenglun was initially serving as the military advisor to the commandant at Qi Prefecture (齊州, roughly modern Jinan, Shandong). Emperor Gaozu's son, the major general Li Shimin the Prince of Qin became aware of Du's talents and invited him to serve as a resident scholar at Li Shimin's mansion.

== During Emperor Taizong's reign ==
In 626, Li Shimin became emperor (as Emperor Taizong). One of his key advisors, Wei Zheng, recommended Du Zhenglun's talent and stated that there were few people as talented. Emperor Taizong then made Du an official at the ministry of defense in 627. In 628, Du was made imperial attendant and put in charge of recording Emperor Taizong's acts for imperial archives. On one occasion, Emperor Taizong stated, "Everyday, as I sit in judgment of important matter and get ready to speak, I think carefully about whether what I have to say has any benefit or harm to the people. That is why I do not speak a lot." Du responded, "Whatever an emperor says is recorded in history. As my responsibility is to record Your Imperial Majesty's acts, I have to be honest. If any of your words is improper, it will harm your reputation for a thousand years, and it is not only harmful to the people. May Your Imperial Majesty consider this carefully." Emperor Taizong was pleased with these words and gave Du an award of silk.

In 630, Du was promoted to the post of Zhongshu Shilang (中書侍郎), the deputy head of the legislative bureau of government (中書省, Zhongshu Sheng). In 632, after Du and three other officials, Wei Ting (韋挺), Yu Shinan, and Yao Silian had submitted petitions commenting on various imperial acts, Emperor Taizong invited them to a feast, where he thanked them for being honest at danger to themselves (as they risked offending the emperor). Du was soon given titles as imperial advisor and scholar, as well as a member of the staff of Emperor Taizong's crown prince Li Chengqian—with Emperor Taizong specifically asked to counsel Li Chengqian in proper behavior. In 636, he was again Zhongshu Shilang, but still served on Li Chengqian's staff; he was also created the Marquess of Nanyang. It was said that Du was known for his capability in handling the matters at both palaces (i.e., the emperor's palace and the crown prince's palace).

However, soon Du drew both the emperor's and the crown prince's ires. At that time, Li Chengqian was suffering from a foot ailment that made it difficult for him to walk, and therefore he did not see Emperor Taizong often, but instead spent his time in frivolous activities with associates that Emperor Taizong disapproved of. Emperor Taizong told Du:

It is not my son's fault that he is ill. However, he has no good reputation, and is not known for endearing himself with good men. Rather, he associates with people of bad character. You should carefully monitor the situation, and if he does not listen to you, you should let me know.

Du made several suggestions to Li Chengqian, asking him to change his ways, but Li Chengqian did not do so. Du told Li Chengqian what Emperor Taizong told him—which led to Li Chengqian immediately submitting an objection to Emperor Taizong. Emperor Taizong asked Du, "Why did you let him know what I said?" Du responded, "He did not listen to me, so I wanted to scare him with your words. I hoped that he would be scared and would change his ways." Emperor Taizong was still displeased, and he demoted Du to the post of prefect of Gu Prefecture (穀州, in modern Luoyang, Henan), and later to be the commandant at Jiao Prefecture (交州, roughly modern Hanoi, Vietnam). After Li Chengqian was revealed to have plotted with the general Hou Junji to overthrow Emperor Taizong in 643, Du was accused of having received a gold belt from Hou, and he was stripped of his rank and exiled to Huan Prefecture (驩州, also in modern Vietnam). However, later he successively served as the prefect of Ying (郢州, roughly modern Wuhan, Hubei) and Shi (石州, roughly modern Lüliang, Shanxi) prefectures.

== During Emperor Gaozong's reign ==
In 656, Du Zhenglun was serving as the deputy minister of treasury, when Emperor Taizong's son and successor Emperor Gaozong promoted him to serve as Huangmen Shilang (黃門侍郎), the deputy head of the examination bureau (門下省, Menxia Sheng). Emperor Gaozong also gave him the designation of Tong Zhongshu Menxia Sanpin (同中書門下三品), making him a chancellor de facto. Du was also created the Duke of Xiangyang. In 657, he was made Zhongshu Ling (中書令), the head of the legislative bureau and a post considered one for a chancellor. Later that year, he concurred with the official Liu Xiangdao that there were too many people made imperial officials, and Emperor Gaozong put them in charge of drafting a proposal to reduce the number of officials. However, their proposal ran into much opposition from other officials and was never carried out.

Meanwhile, Du was beginning to have conflict with fellow chancellor Li Yifu, who also carried the title of Zhongshu Ling, as Du considered himself the senior official, but Li, who was an ally of Emperor Gaozong's powerful wife Empress Wu (later known as Wu Zetian), disrespected Du. They argued frequently before Emperor Gaozong, who rebuked both for not cooperating with each other. On December 6, 658, Emperor Gaozong demoted both to be prefects—in Du's case, the prefect of Heng Prefecture (橫州, roughly modern Nanning, Guangxi). Du was said to have died at Heng Prefecture soon thereafter.

== Notes and references ==
- Old Book of Tang, vol. 70.
- New Book of Tang, vol. 106.
- Zizhi Tongjian, vols. 192, 193, 194, 197, 200.
