= Wei Daijia =

Tang dynasty official (died c.689)

Wei Daijia (Chinese: 韋待價; died 689?) was a general and official of the Tang dynasty of China, serving as chancellor during the first reign of the Emperor Ruizong.

== Background ==
It is not known when Wei Daijia was born, but it was known that his family was from Yong Prefecture (雍州, roughly modern Xi'an, Shaanxi), the capital prefecture for both the Tang dynasty and its predecessor dynasty the Sui dynasty. Wei Daijia's grandfather Wei Chong (韋沖) served as a minister during Sui, and his father Wei Ting (韋挺) served as an official in late Sui and during Tang, under its first two emperors Emperor Gaozu and Emperor Taizong. Wei Daijia himself started his government career service as an officer in the imperial guard corps, and he married a daughter of the renowned general Li Daozong the Prince of Jiangxia (Emperor Taizong's cousin).

== During Emperor Gaozong's reign ==
Emperor Taizong died in 649 and was succeeded by his son Li Zhi the Crown Prince (as Emperor Gaozong). In 653, Li Daozong, who had been in a conflict with Emperor Gaozong's powerful uncle, the chancellor Zhangsun Wuji, was exiled, and as a result of his status as Li Daozong's son-in-law, Wei Daijia was sent out of the capital Chang'an to serve as an officer at Lulong Base (盧龍府, in modern Qinhuangdao, Hebei). On one occasion, the general Xin Wenling (辛文陵) was patrolling the border with Goguryeo, when Goguryeo forces ambushed him and initially defeated him. Wei and another officer, Xue Rengui, led their troops to try to aid Xin, who was eventually able to fight off the Goguryeo forces. During the battle, Wei suffered serious injuries, including being hit in the left foot with an arrow, but declined to claim accomplishments from the battle. As a result of his injuries, he was eventually removed from his post.

Later, Wei was made the prefect of Lan Prefecture (蘭州, roughly modern Lanzhou, Gansu). At that time, Tufan posed a serious threat to Tang's western prefectures, and Emperor Gaozong made his son Li Xian the Prince of Pei nominally the commandant at Liang Prefecture (涼州, roughly modern Wuwei, Gansu) and made Wei his military advisor. He later served as the prefect of Su Prefecture (肅州, roughly modern Jiuquan, Gansu), and was said to have done well in defending the prefecture against Tufan attacks. He was recalled to Chang'an to serve as a commanding general of the imperial guards. During a Tufan attack in 678, he was briefly made acting commandant at Liang Prefecture to defend against the attack, but was soon recalled to Chang'an. He was also created the Marquess of Fuyang.

== During Emperor Ruizong's reign ==
Emperor Gaozong died in 683 and was succeeded by his son Li Zhe the Crown Prince (as Emperor Zhongzong), but actual power was in the hands of Emperor Gaozong's powerful wife Empress Wu (later known as Wu Zetian) as empress dowager and regent. In 684, when Emperor Zhongzong showed signs of independence, she deposed him and replaced him with his brother Li Dan the Prince of Yu (as Emperor Ruizong), but thereafter wielded power even more firmly. Around this time, she made Wei Daijia the minister of civil service affairs and acting Sikong (司空, one of the Three Excellencies), putting him in charge of constructing Emperor Gaozong's tomb. After the tomb was completed, in 685, she awarded him the honorific title of Zijin Guanglu Daifu (紫金光祿大夫). She also gave him the designation Tong Fengge Luantai Sanpin (同鳳閣鸞臺三品), making him a chancellor de facto. She further awarded him silk and made one of his sons an official of the fifth rank. It was said that Wei, because he had a military background, lacked talent for selecting officials, and therefore did not have a good reputation as a minister of civil service affairs.

Later in 685, Empress Dowager Wu commissioned Wei to lead an army to defend against an Eastern Tujue attack—a campaign that lasted until spring 686. In summer 686, she made him Wenchang You Xiang (文昌右相)—one of the heads of the executive bureau of government (文昌臺, Wenchang Tai). It was said that Wei felt that his promotions were undeserved and was not feeling comfortable about them, and therefore repeatedly offered to resign, but Empress Dowager Wu repeatedly declined. He also requested that some of his titles be removed and that his father Wei Ting, who had died late in Emperor Taizong's reign in exile, be posthumously honored, and therefore she posthumously honored Wei Ting as the prefect of Run Prefecture (潤州, roughly modern Zhenjiang, Jiangsu). In 689, Wei Daijia requested that he be put back into command of an army, and so Empress Dowager Wu commissioned him to attack Tufan, commanding 36 generals; she also created him the Duke of Fuyang. He set out on the campaign and encountered Tufan forces at Yinshijia River (寅識迦河, flowing through Ili Kazakh Autonomous Prefecture, Xinjiang). He enjoyed some initial success, but was eventually defeated by Tufan forces. Further, it was cold and the food supplies were low, causing many deaths due to cold and hunger; this forced him to withdraw to Gaochang. Empress Dowager Wu was incensed, and she executed Wei's deputy Yan Wengu (閻溫古) for having hesitated during the campaign, while exiling Wei to Xiu Prefecture (繡州, roughly modern Guigang, Guangxi). He died in exile soon thereafter.

== Descendants ==
- Wei Yingwu, acknowledged poet of the Tang dynasty.
