= Zhang Guangfu =

General and politician of the Chinese Tang Dynasty

Zhang Guangfu (張光輔) (died August 24, 689) was a Chinese military general and politician of the Chinese Tang dynasty, serving as chancellor during the first reign of Emperor Ruizong.

It is not known when Zhang Guangfu was born, but it is known that he was from the Tang capital Chang'an. He was said to be intelligent and good at rhetoric in his youth, and also capable as an official. He was eventually promoted to the posts of deputy minister of agriculture (司農少卿, Sinong Shaoqing) and then Wenchang Zuo Cheng (文昌左丞), one of the secretaries general of the executive bureau of government (文昌臺, Wenchang Tai). In 687, he was made Fengge Shilang (鳳閣侍郎), the deputy head of the legislative bureau of government (鳳閣, Fengge), and given the designation Tong Fengge Luantai Pinzhangshi (同鳳閣鸞臺平章事), making him a chancellor de facto. In 688, when Emperor Ruizong's uncle Li Zhen the Prince of Yue rebelled against the rule of Emperor Ruizong's powerful mother and regent Empress Dowager Wu (later known as Wu Zetian), Empress Dowager Wu commissioned Zhang to command the troops against Li Zhen, assisted by fellow chancellor Cen Changqian and Qu Chongyu (麴崇裕). Li Zhen was quickly defeated. Thereafter, Empress Dowager Wu gave him the greater chancellor designation of Tong Fengge Luantai Sanpin (同鳳閣鸞臺三品). (It was said, however, that Zhang's soldiers, without any discouragement from him, pillaged the people of Yu Prefecture (豫州, roughly modern Zhumadian, Henan), and that Zhang further demanded all kinds of supplies from the new prefect of Yu Prefecture, Di Renjie, leading to an intense argument between Zhang and Di in which Di stated that if he had the authority to do so, he would have beheaded Zhang on the spot, even if it meant his own death.)

In 689, Empress Dowager Wu made Zhang acting Nayan (納言) -- the head of the examination bureau (鸞臺, Luantai) and a post considered one for a chancellor. Later that year, she made him acting Neishi (內史) -- the head of the legislative bureau and a post also considered one for a chancellor. He was considered capable at both positions. However, his fall would come in the fall of that year. Xu Jingzhen (徐敬真), the younger brother of Xu Jingye the Duke of Ying, who had led an unsuccessful rebellion against Empress Dowager Wu in 684, had been exiled to Xiu Prefecture (繡州, roughly modern Guigang, Guangxi), but fled from the place of exile and intended to flee north to Eastern Tujue. When he went through the eastern capital Luoyang, the officials Gong Siye (弓嗣業) and Zhang Siming (張嗣明) gave him money to use in flight. When Xu went through Ding Prefecture (定州, roughly modern Baoding, Hebei), he was captured and brought back to Luoyang for interrogation. Gong committed suicide, but both Xu and Zhang Siming, in interrogation, implicated many officials, hoping that by doing so they could ingratiate Empress Dowager Wu and her secret police officials so that they could be spared. Zhang Siming, in particular, claimed that when Zhang Guangfu was attacking Li Zhen, he secretly consulted fortunetelling books to try to see what the future might hold, and intentionally slowed to see whether Li Zhen's rebellion had any hope. As a result of Zhang Siming's claims, Zhang Guangfu was arrested and executed with Xu and Zhang Siming, and his assets were seized.

== Notes and references ==
- Old Book of Tang, vol. 90.
- Zizhi Tongjian, vol. 204.
