= Qian Weidao =

Qian Weidao (騫味道) (died January 11, 689) was a Chinese politician who served twice as a chancellor of the Chinese Tang dynasty, during the first reign of Emperor Ruizong.

Little is known about Qian Weidao's career before his first stint as chancellor, as, atypical for a chancellor, he did not have a biography in either the Old Book of Tang or the New Book of Tang. It is, however, known that his family was from Jincheng (金城, in modern Lanzhou, Gansu). As of 684, he was serving as imperial censor reviewing central government affairs (左肅政大夫), when he and his subordinate, Yu Chengye (魚承曄), was put in charge by Emperor Ruizong's powerful mother and regent Empress Dowager Wu (later known as Wu Zetian) of investigating and interrogating the chancellor Pei Yan after accusations of treason, as Pei had angered her by suggesting that she return imperial authority to Emperor Ruizong. Many officials spoke on Pei's behalf, but Empress Dowager Wu reacted by arresting and demoting them, while promoting Qian and an official who had testified that Pei had committed treason, Li Jingchen, to be chancellors—in Qian's case, with the designation Tong Fengge Luantai Sanpin (同鳳閣鸞臺三品), a greater designation than Li's Tong Fengge Luantai Pingzhangshi (同鳳閣鸞臺平章事) designation. She also made him acting Neishi (內史) -- the head of the legislative bureau of government (鳳閣, Fengge) and a post considered one for a chancellor.

In 685, there was an incident that made Empress Dowager Wu demote Qian. At that time, the official Fang Xianmin (房先敏) was demoted, and he met the chancellors to complain about the demotion. Qian told Fang, "This was the Empress Dowager's decision." Another chancellor, Liu Yizhi, instead stated, "You were dragged into this because of another's fault, and your demotion was based on the decision of the officials." These words were reported to Empress Dowager Wu, and she was displeased that Qian blamed her and pleased that Liu did not, and she demoted Qian to be the prefect of Qing Prefecture (青州, roughly modern Weifang, Shandong) while promoting Liu.

By 688, Qian was again the imperial censor reviewing central government affairs. Winter of that year, he was made chancellor again, this time with the designation of Tong Fengge Luantai Pingzhangshi. However, he was soon falsely accused of unspecified crimes—and Empress Dowager Wu gave the case to Qian's subordinate Zhou Ju (周矩) for investigation. It was said that Qian had often been unimpressed with Zhou and rebuked him for being unable to complete tasks. When Zhou interrogated Qian, Zhou stated, "You often rebuke me for being unable to complete tasks. I will complete one for you today." Around the new year 689, Qian and his son Qian Ciyu (騫辭玉) were executed.

== Notes and references ==
- Zizhi Tongjian, vols. 203, 204.
