= Li Jingchen =

Chancellor of the Chinese Tang dynasty

Li Jingchen (李景諶) was briefly a chancellor of the Chinese Tang dynasty, during the first reign of Emperor Ruizong.

Little is known about Li Jingchen's career before or after his brief stint as chancellor, as, atypical for a chancellor, he did not have a biography in either the Old Book of Tang or the New Book of Tang. As of 684, he was serving as Fengge Sheren (鳳閣舍人), a mid-level official at the legislative bureau of government (鳳閣, Fengge), when the head of the legislative bureau, the chancellor Pei Yan, was accused of treason after angering Emperor Ruizong's powerful mother and regent Empress Dowager Wu (later known as Wu Zetian) by suggesting that she return imperial authorities to Emperor Ruizong. Many imperial officials spoke in Pei's defense, but Li Jingchen was said to be one of the officials who testified that Pei was planning treason. Empress Dowager Wu arrested and demoted many officials who defended Pei, while promoting Li and the official who investigated Pei, Qian Weidao, to chancellor positions—in Li's case, with the designation of Tong Fenge Luantai Pingchangshi (同鳳閣鸞臺平章事), signifying a lesser designation than the Tong Fenge Luantai Sanpin (同鳳閣鸞臺三品) designation that Qian received. However, the day after Pei was executed—just 10 days after Li was made chancellor—Empress Dowager Wu removed the chancellor designation from Li, making him the deputy minister of vassal affairs (司賓少卿, Sibin Shaoqing) instead. There was no further record about Li in official histories, and there appears to be no historical record of his death.

== Notes and references ==
- Zizhi Tongjian, vol. 203.
