= Paekche–Tang War =

7th century war in Asia

- Part of Goguryeo–Tang War
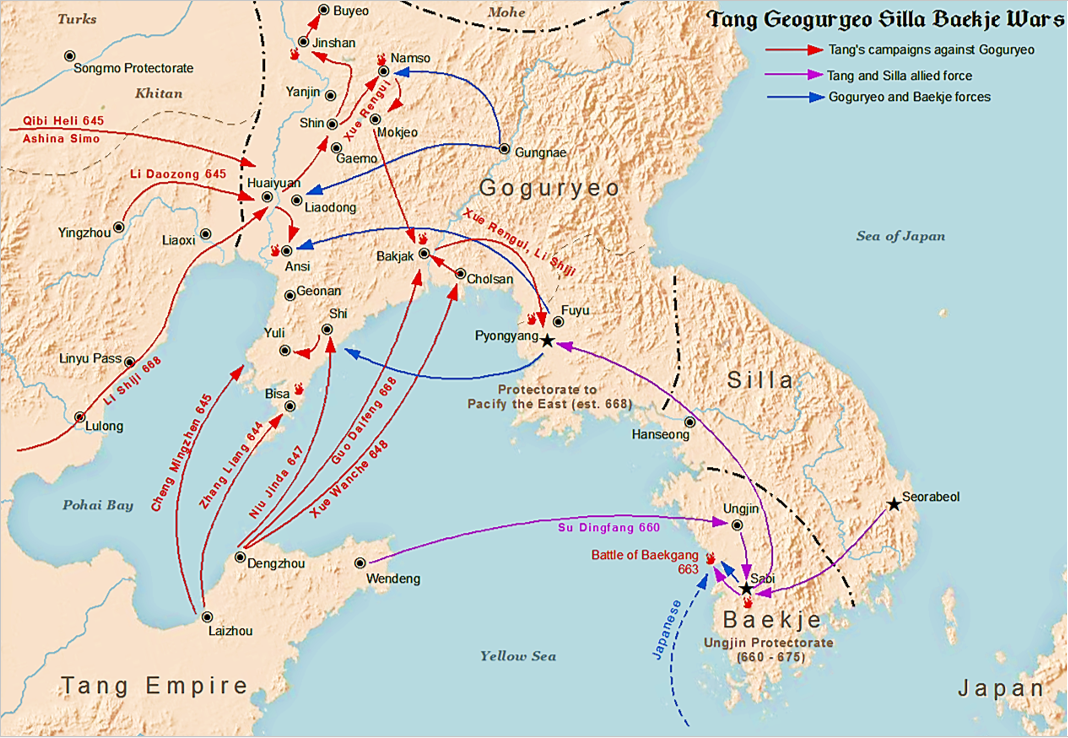
Date	660 (nation); 660–663 (resistance)
Location	Southwestern Korean Peninsula and Yellow Sea
Result	Tang-Silla coalition victory
Territorial changes	Annexation of Paekche by Tang

Belligerents
Tang; Silla	Paekche; Yamato (at the Battle of Baekgang); Goguryeo

Commanders and leaders
Tang: Su Dingfang; Liu Rengui; Silla: Kim Chun-Chu; Gim Yu-sin	Paekche: Uija of Baekje (executed); Buyeo Yung; Gyebaek †; Heukchi Sangji (surrendered); Gwisil Boksin (executed); Dochim; Yamato: Abe no Hirafu; Echi no Takutsu †

The Paekche–Tang War was fought between Paekche and the allied forces of the Tang dynasty and Silla between 660 and 663. The war was caused by the ongoing Goguryeo–Tang War in which numerous attacks and raids were made by Baekje and Goguryeo against Silla. King Muyeol of Silla sought help from Emperor Gaozong of Tang, who launched the invasion of Paekche in 660. After the conquest of Paekche later that year, loyalist forces from Paekche with the aid of Yamato allies attempted to resist the occupation of their kingdom until the two allied forces were destroyed in 663.

== Background ==
The Silla kingdom had formed a military alliance with the Tang empire under Emperor Gaozong's reign. When Goguryeo and Paekche attacked Silla from the north and west respectively, Queen Seondeok of Silla sent an emissary to the Tang empire to request military assistance. In 650, Emperor Gaozong received a poem, written by Queen Seondeok, from the princely emissary Kim Chunchu (who would later accede the Silla throne as King Muyeol). Paekche had allied with Yamato Wa in 653. Even though Paekche was allied with Goguryeo, the Han River valley separated the two states and was a hindrance in coming to each other's aid in time of war. King Muyeol assumed the Silla throne in 654. Between 655 and 659, the border of Silla was harassed by Paekche and Goguryeo; Silla therefore requested assistance from Tang.

== Course of the war ==
In 660, a Tang army of 130,000 set out towards Paekche to further relieve Silla. The army led by Admiral Su Dingfang sailed across the Yellow Sea towards and landed on the western coastline of Paekche. The Tang army defeated a Paekche force at the mouth of the Geum River and then sailed up the river towards Sabi, the capital of Paekche.

Crown Prince Kim Beopmin, General Kim Yusin, General Kim Pumil, and General Kim Hŭmsun were dispatched with a Silla army and set off westwards into the Battle of Hwangsanbeol. It comprised 50,000 troops. They marched into Paekche from the eastern border, and crossed through the Sobaek Mountains. General Kim Yusin led the Silla army across the passes of Tanhyon towards Hwangsan Plain, but General Gyebaek could only muster a force of about 5,000 Paekche troops in defense against the advancing Silla army. At Hwangsan Plain, the Silla army defeated the Paekche forces of General Gyebaek.

The capital of Paekche, Sabi, fell to the forces of Tang and Silla. Around 10,000 Paekche troops were killed in the siege. Paekche was conquered on 18 July 660, when King Uija of Baekje surrendered at Ungjin. The Tang army took the king, crown prince, 93 officials, and 20,000 troops as prisoner. The king and crown prince were sent as hostages to the Tang empire. The territory of Paekche was annexed by the Tang, which established five military administrations to control the region instead of Silla, which they painfully accepted.

== Course of resistance ==
In a final effort, General Gwisil Boksin led the Paekche revival movement against Tang occupation. He requested military assistance from their Yamato allies. In 661, Empress Saimei (who previously reigned as Empress Kōgyoku) and Prince Naka no Ōe prepared for battle and sent Prince Buyeo Pung of Paekche, who had been in Yamato Wa for over 30 years, to aid the resistance. In 662, they sent an expedition to assist General Boksin.

Although the restoration forces had some initial success against Tang and Silla troops, by 662, they were in serious trouble, and their area of control was confined to the fortress of Churyu and its immediate vicinity. As their situation went from bad to worse, Buyeo Pung had Boksin killed for fear of insurrection. A year later, 27,000 Yamato troops were sent as reinforcements. The Tang fleet, comprising 170 ships, advanced towards Chuyu and encircled the city at Baekgang River.

In 663 at the battle of Baekgang, the Paekche resistance and Yamato forces were annihilated by the Tang and Silla forces. As the Yamato fleet engaged the Tang fleet throughout the course of two days, they were eventually worn down by the Tang fleet and were destroyed in a decisive counterattack. During the engagement, General Echi no Takutsu was slain. Prince Buyeo Pung of Paekche and a few of his men fled to Goguryeo.

The natives rebelled and besieged Liu Renyuan in the capital until Liu Rengui could bring in reinforcements. A stalemate ensued with Paekche holding some cities while Silla and the Tang occupied others. In the autumn of 663, a combined Tang-Silla army marched for Chuyu, the capital of the rebels. Chuyu was captured on 14 October and the rebellion was vanquished.

== See also ==
- Goguryeo–Tang War
- Silla–Tang War
- Protectorate General to Pacify the East

== Bibliography ==
- Ebrey, Patricia Buckley; Walthall, Anne; Palais, James B. (2006). East Asia: A cultural, social, and political history. Boston: Houghton Mifflin. ISBN 9780618133840.
- Farris, William Wayne (1985). Population, disease, and land in early Japan, 645-900. Cambridge: Harvard University Press. ISBN 9780674690059.
- Graff, David A. (2002). Medieval Chinese Warfare, 300–900. London: Routledge. ISBN 9780415239554.
- Kim, Djun Kil (2005). The history of Korea (1st ed.). Westport: Greenwood Press. ISBN 9780313038532.
- Lee, Kenneth B. (1997). Korea and East Asia: The story of a phoenix. Westport: Praeger. ISBN 9780275958237.
- Ota, Fumio (2012). "The Japanese way of war". The Oxford handbook on war. Corby: Oxford University Press. ISBN 9780199562930.
- Seth, Michael J. (2010). A history of Korea: From antiquity to the present. Lanham: Rowman & Littlefield. ISBN 9780742567177.
- Yu, Chai-Shin (2012). The new history of Korean civilization. Bloomington: iUniverse. ISBN 9781462055593.
