= Buyeo Sa =

- Hangul: 부여사
- Hanja: 扶餘絲
- RR: Buyeo Sa
- MR: Puyŏ Sa

Buyeo Sa (扶餘絲, ? – ?) was a prince of Baekje, one of the Three Kingdoms of Korea. He was the son of Buyeo Pung by a Japanese woman and also grandson of the last king of Baekje, Uija of Baekje. He is also called Sa-wang (絲王). In Japan he was known as Teika-Ō (禎嘉王), also as Kudara no Ookimi and Kudara no Miko (百済王).

He had been in Japan when Sabi, the capital fell to the Silla–Tang alliance in 660 and his grandfather and uncles were taken to China. His father was crowned by Gwisil Boksin as King Pungjang (豊璋王) but they were defeated in 663 and his father was sent to China as well. After that Sa became the nominal successor to the throne of Baekje but this chance never came and Baekje was gone forever. The Nihon Shoki records that he was assassinated by Silla agents in Japan. He settled in Miyazaki Prefecture, Kyushu and as recorded in the Shinsen Shōjiroku became ancestor of Japanese clans. His immediate descendants were still called (百濟王, King of Baekje).

One of his uncles, Zenkō (善光 or 禅広), also settled in Japan and was given the family name Kudara no Konikishi (百濟王; king of Baekje) by the emperor of Japan.

There is a shrine in Miyazuki Prefecture dedicated to him and his family, Mikado-jinja (神門神社), located in Misato Cho, Mikado village (美郷町南郷区神門). Buyeo Sa (Teika-Ō) is worshiped as the main deity.

- "Teika-O, also known as Kudara no Ookimi, Kudara no Miko 百済王. When the Emperor lost his power to the enemies, he and his family fled to Japan and settled in the Nara region. After more troubles they ended up in Miyazaki, Kyushu. Their ships got into a storm, and Father Teika-Ō landed at Kanegahama beach in now hyuuga town 日向市の金ヶ浜f, while his sun Fukuchi-Ō landed at Kaguchi-Ura near Takanabe village 高鍋町の蚊口浦. But they were found out by their enemy and Taika-Ō died by an arrow during a battle. His son Kachi-Ō 華智王 also died during this battle. According to the local legend, the shrine has been built in 718 - 養老2年. It preserves a lot of treasures with a Korean flavor. At the shrine Hiki Jinja 比木神社 in 木城町, the deity Fukuchi-Ō 福智王, the eldest son of Teika-O, is venerated.

He goes to visit his father at Mikado Jinja during a special festival parade once a year. The simple shrine is located in a lonely pine forest and tended to by the local people. It is supposed to be the former residence of Teika-O. Most of its history is still shrouded in mystery."

== Family ==
- Father: Buyeo Pung
- Mother: unknown Japanese woman
  - Wife: unknown
    - Son: Fukuchi-Ō (禎嘉王, ?–718), killed by Silla agents.
      - Grandson: Kachi-Ō (華智王, ?–718), killed by Silla agents.

== See also ==
- Uija of Baekje
- Silla–Tang alliance
- History of Korea
- Three Kingdoms of Korea
- List of monarchs of Korea
