= Buyeo Chung'seung =

7th century Korean Buyeo prince

- Hangul: 부여충승
- Hanja: 扶餘忠勝
- RR: Buyeo Chungseung
- MR: Puyŏ Ch'ungsŭng

Buyeo Chung'seung (扶餘忠勝, ? – ?) was a prince of Baekje, one of the Three Kingdoms of Korea. He was a son of the last king, Uija of Baekje. When Sabi, the capital fell to the Silla–Tang alliance in 660 he fled to Ungjin with his mother the queen.

They went to Busosanseong (Busosan Fortress) where they held out for a short time but there were many that knew that could not withstand the forces of the Silla-Tang alliance and a certain soldier opened up the gate and surrendered to fortress. After this he was taken to Luoyang in China where he disappears from history.

One of his brothers, Zenkō (善光 or 禅広), settled in Japan and was given the family name Kudara no Konikishi (百濟王; king of Baekje) by the emperor of Japan.
