= Battle of Sasu =

- Part of Goguryeo–Tang War
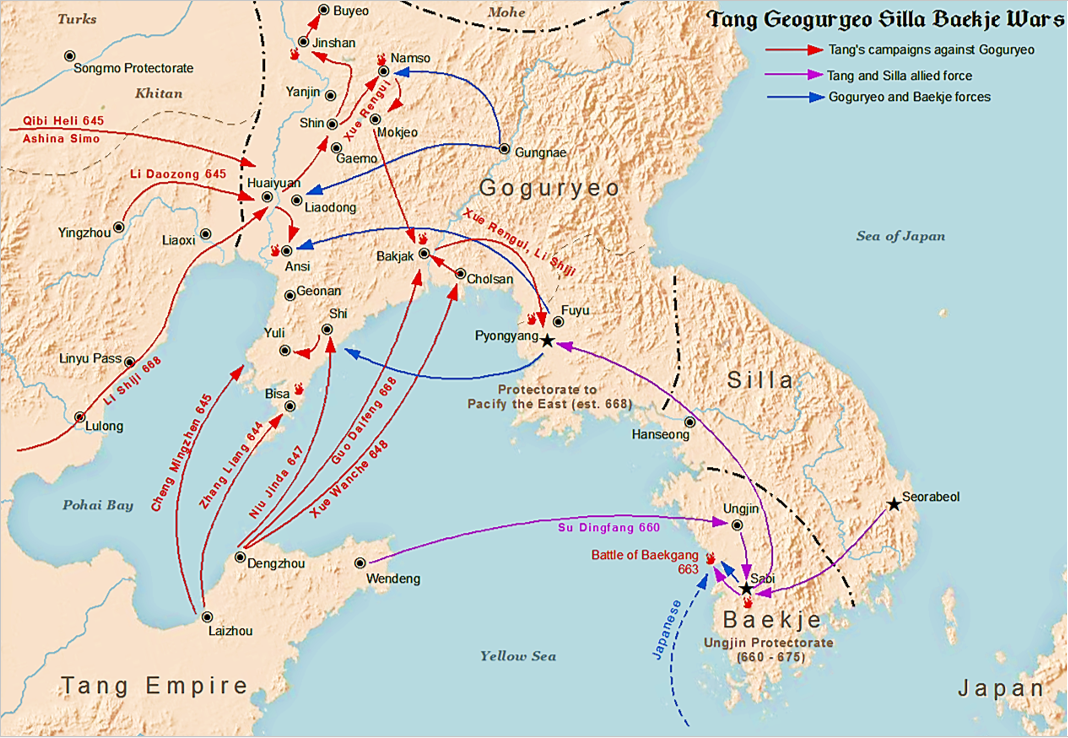
- Map showing the invasion of Goguryeo by the Tang forces from 645 to 668 AD
Date	February 21, 662
Location	Sasu River, Goguryeo (probably modern-day Pothong River, present-day North Korea)
Result	Goguryeo victory

Belligerents
Tang China	Goguryeo Korea

Commanders and leaders
Pang Xiaotai †	Yŏn Kaesomun

Strength
100,000	100,000

Casualties and losses
Entire forces annihilated	Unknown

The Battle of the Sasu River, also known as Battle of Sasu (Korean: 사수 전투 Sasu Jeontu) (Chinese: 蛇水之战 Shéshuǐ Zhīzhàn) was a battle between Tang Chinese and Goguryeo Korean forces that took place in 662 AD. A Chinese army, mostly consisting of soldiers from Lingnan, were led by general Pang Xiaotai while the Goguryeo army was led by the generalissimo Yŏn Kaesomun. The Goguryeo army won the battle and the Tang army was crushed.

== Prelude ==
The Emperor of China, Gaozhong of Tang, has succeeded his father Taizhong on the throne and with it his dreams of the conquest of the Korean kingdom of Goguryeo, an attempt he have failed throughout his reign. He resumed the conquest in 660 and sent 350,000 soldiers for the task, along with assistance in supplies and provisions from another Korean kingdom, Silla, with which he was allied with. The Chinese invasion army was divided into different forces, with one force led by admiral Su Dingfang consisting of 130,000 men on several thousand ships sailing across the Yellow Sea via several thousand ships from Shandong peninsula to the Korean kingdom of Baekje which along with Silla they jointly conquered, while another one is led by generals Pang Xiotai and Liu Demin marching via Liaodong Peninsula along the old Okjeo road heading to the Goguryeo capital city of Pyongyang with 100,000 soldiers from Lingnan.

The winter of late 661 was particularly harsh for the invading Chinese forces, resulting to them putting onto winter quarters in any nearest occupied Goguryeo settlement. What was supposed to be a pincer action targeting Pyongyang did not go as planned, as much of the army that conquered Baekje to the south was busy dealing with restorationist rebels led by Gwisil Boksin, now made worse by the intervention of Japan whom they sent the exiled Baekje prince Buyeo Pung back to lead the revolt., while the now much reduced army of Su Dingfang were busy besieging Pyongyang, unable to overcome its defenses in accounts of the harsh cold weather and their lesser numbers than needed so much so that the northern boundaries of the city remained open. Making matters worse is the revolt of the Tiele in the western edge of the Chinese empire which forced the Tang emperor to commit some of his forces already invading Goguryeo to crush it, thereby reducing their numbers in the front. With this, known via scouts and messengers, came the opportunity for the Goguryeo dictator Yŏn Kaesomun to gather all of the kingdom's remaining forces to the capital Pyongyang to wipe Pang Xiotai's force stranded nearby the Sasu River which is likely present-day Botong River to the north, before they could unite with Su Dingfang's force to the south and completely encircle the still-besieged Pyongyang.

== Battle ==
In 21 February 662, Yŏn Kaesomun led the Goguryeo army intercepted the Tang army at the Sasu River, annihilating it. Its general Pang Xiaotai and all his 13 sons were killed. With the northern front secure, Yŏn Kaesomun went back to relieve Pyongyang. Coupled with harsh snowstorms, Su Dingfang then withdrew his forces, ending the siege.

== Aftermath ==
Goguryeo had little time to celebrate the victory at Sasu, as it was ravaged by decades of continuous warfare. Yŏn Kaesomun died four years later, and six years later Goguryeo was later conquered by Tang China.
