= Liu Rengui =

Chinese military general and politician (c.602 - 685)

Liu Rengui (劉仁軌) (601/602 – March 2, 685), courtesy name Zhengze (正則), formally Duke Wenxian of Lecheng (樂城文獻公), was a Chinese military general and politician during the Tang dynasty, serving as chancellor during the reign of Emperor Gaozong that was dominated by Empress Wu, and the subsequent regency of Empress Dowager Wu over his sons Emperor Zhongzong and Emperor Ruizong. He was known for his military prowess, particularly displayed in the conquest of Baekje, as well as political skills that allowed him to maintain good relationships with colleagues and the strong-willed Empress Wu.

== Background ==
Liu Rengui was born in 601 or 602, during the reign of Emperor Wen of Sui. He was from what would later be Bian Prefecture (汴州, roughly modern Kaifeng, Henan). It was said that he was respectful and studious in his youth, but in the disturbances that resulted in the Sui dynasty's downfall in 619, he was unable to spend much time in studying and was forced to flee the wars from time to time, and he would practice his calligraphy by writing on dirt. Early during the reign of the founder of the succeeding Tang dynasty, Emperor Gaozu, one of Emperor Gaozu's generals, Ren Gui (任瓌), who was in charge of the modern Henan region, had drafted a report to Emperor Gaozu, when, for reasons unstated in historical records, Liu Rengui had an opportunity to read it. Liu was able to improve on the report by making several simple character changes, and this surprised Ren, who then recommended him as the military advisor to the prefect of Xi Prefecture (息州, roughly modern Xinyang, Henan), and later as the sheriff of Chencang County (陳倉, in modern Baoji, Shaanxi).

== During Emperor Taizong's reign ==
Sometime prior to 640 but during the reign of Emperor Gaozu's successor Emperor Taizong, there was an occasion when a military officer, Lu Ning (魯寧), who, by virtue of his office, was higher ranked than Liu Rengui (fourth or fifth rank, compared to Liu's ninth rank), was accused of crimes and held in custody at the county jail in Chencang. He, proud of his rank, repeatedly insulted and cursed at Liu. Liu, in anger, battered Lu to death with a cane. When this was reported to Emperor Taizong, Emperor Taizong, in anger, ordered that Liu be executed, but as he was pondering how a lowly ranked sheriff would dare to kill a highly ranked military officer, and so had Liu, prior to execution, delivered to the capital Chang'an for him to personally examine him. When he asked Liu the reason he killed Lu, Liu calmly, without appearance of fear, stated, "Lu insulted me and shamed me in front of the people I govern, and I got so angry that I battered him to death." The chancellor Wei Zheng, who happened to be present, spoke on Liu's behalf, arguing that a reason for Sui's downfall was that the people had no respect for local officials and did not hesitate from resisting them. Emperor Taizong withdrew his order to execute Liu and further promoted him to be the secretary general of Yueyang County (櫟陽, in modern Xi'an, Shaanxi), close to the capital.

In 640, when Emperor Taizong was about to go on a hunt in Tong Prefecture (同州, roughly modern Weinan, Shaanxi), Liu submitted a petition pointing out that it was harvest time and that the farmers would be greatly interfered with by a hunt, particularly since a good number of them would have to be conscripted to fix the roads. He asked that Emperor Taizong delay his hunt by 10 days. Emperor Taizong agreed, and praised Liu for his petition. He soon promoted Liu to be the magistrate of Xin'an County. Eventually, he was promoted to the post of imperial attendant.

== During Emperor Gaozong's reign ==
=== Campaign against Baekje ===
It appeared that Liu Rengui remained at the post of imperial attendant for at least a decade, after Emperor Taizong's death in 649 and succession by his son Emperor Gaozong. In 656, he was involved in the inquiry into one of Emperor Gaozong's most trusted officials, the chancellor Li Yifu, as Li was accused of being enamored with a beautiful prisoner, a Lady Chunyu, and getting the secretary general of the supreme court, Bi Zhengyi (畢正義) to improperly release her so that he could take her as a concubine. When the chief judge of the supreme court, Duan Baoxuan (段寶玄) realized this, he reported this to Emperor Gaozong, and Emperor Gaozong put Liu in charge of the investigation. During the investigation, Li, wanting to avoid further scrutiny, forced Bi to commit suicide, and the interrogation was aborted. Still, Liu's investigation drew hatred from Li.

In 659, Liu was made the prefect of Qing Prefecture (青州, roughly modern Weifang, Shandong), at Li's instigation. In 660, as Emperor Gaozong was launching a major campaign against Goguryeo, Liu was in charge of supplying the army through sea shipping, but the ships that he was in charge of met a major storm, and a large number of the ships were lost. Li, hearing this, sent the imperial investigator Yuan Yishi (袁異式) to Qing Prefecture, hoping to intimidate Liu into committing suicide, but Liu refused. Yuan put Liu in chains and returned to Chang'an to submit his report. Li insisted to Emperor Gaozong that Liu be put to death, but Emperor Gaozong pointed out that Liu could not be held responsible for the storm, instead reducing him to commoner rank and having him join the army in that status.

Meanwhile, the general Su Dingfang had destroyed Goguryeo's ally Baekje in 660, left his assistant Liu Renyuan (劉仁願) in charge of the former Baekje capital Sabi, and then withdrew. Su's mistreatment of the Baekje people, however, caused much resentment toward Tang forces, and after Su's departure, the Buddhist monk Dochim/Daochen (道琛) and the Baekje general Buyeo Boksin/Fuyu Fuxin rose in resistance to Tang forces, with Juryu/Zhouliu (주류/周留, in modern Seocheon County, South Chungcheong) as their headquarters. They also welcomed back the Baekje prince Buyeo Pung/Fuyu Feng back from Japan, where he had served as a hostage-to-be-king, and their forces were strengthened. They put Sabi, defended by Liu Renyuan, under siege. Emperor Gaozong put Liu Rengui in command of an army that another general, Wang Wendu (王文度), who had recently died, would have commanded, and had him aid Liu Renyuan. Liu Rengui was pleased at the news, and was said to have immediately leapt up and stated, "Heaven is giving glory and wealth to this old man!" He then, after confidently requesting the imperial calendar and the names of the imperial ancestors (in order to promulgate to the Baekje people for naming taboo purposes), departed for Baekje. Fighting the Baekje resistance forces in conjunction with forces from Tang's ally Silla, he was able to force them to lift the siege on Sabi. However, he and Liu Renyuan still had too few forces, particularly after Silla forces withdrew after suffering defeats, so for a time Liu Renyuan and Liu Rengui held defensive position.

Meanwhile, Su, who had been attacking Gogureyo and putting its capital Pyongyang under siege, was forced to withdraw in spring 662 after the general Pang Xiaotai (龐孝泰) was defeated and killed by Goguryeo forces. Emperor Gaozong issued an edict, ordering Liu Renyuan and Liu Rengui to abandon Sabi and march to Silla—and then, at the option of Silla's King Munmu (Kim Beopmin/Jin Famin), remain to help defend Silla or return to Tang. The soldiers largely wanted to accept these orders, but Liu Rengui pointed out if they abandoned Sabi, Baekje would be reestablished and would not be able to be defeated. However, believing that LIu Renyuan and Liu Rengui would surely abandon Sabi, Buyeo Pung and Buyeo Boksin (who had by now assassinated Dochim and taken over the rest of the army) were becoming overly confident and not taking precautions. Liu Rengui caught them by surprise and captured a number of cities they held, including a strip of territory that allowed Silla forces to supply Sabi with food. Liu Renyuan reported this to Emperor Gaozong and requested reinforcements, and Emperor Gaozong sent 7,000 men, as well as Buyeo Pung's brother Buyeo Yung/Fuyu Long, who was familiar with the territory.

Meanwhile, Buyeo Pung and Buyeo Boksin were beginning to suspect each other as well, and Buyeo Pung killed Buyeo Boksin in an ambush and then sought aid from Goguryeo and Japan. At Liu Rengui's insistence, in 663, the Tang/Silla forces headed directly for the Baekje headquarters at Juryu, defeating joint Baekje/Japanese forces. Buyeo Pung fled to Goguryeo, and the rest of the Baekje resistance forces surrendered, ending the Baekje resistance movement. Emperor Gaozong recalled Liu Renyuan and left Liu Rengui in charge of Baekje's former territory. It was said that Liu Rengui was effective in comforting the Baekje people and restoring social order after years of warfare had rendered the region in waste. He was also credited with treating two Baekje generals, Heukchi Sangji/Heichi Changzhi and Sataek Sangyeo/Shazha Xiangru (沙吒相如) with kindness, after they had participated in Baekje's resistance movement, pointing out that they were compelled to do so after Su mistreated the Baekje people—and he was able to receive their allegiance, allowing him to, with their serving as his forward commanders, defeat the last Baekje general holding out, Ji Susin/Chi Shouxin (遲受信). After Liu Renyuan returned to Chang'an, he endorsed Liu Rengui's abilities, and Emperor Gaozong gave Liu Rengui honors, including a house at the capital.

=== After the campaign against Baekje ===
In 664, Liu Rengui, by now carrying the higher rank of commandant, submitted a petition pointing out that the soldiers stationed at Baekje was facing much difficulties, after having been away from home for five years, and should be greatly rewarded. Emperor Gaozong partially agreed with Liu Rengui's pleas and sent Liu Renyuan to relieve him with new reinforcements, but Liu Rengui did not believe this to be the right course of action further, believing that the army should remain to prepare for the next campaign against Goguryeo, and Emperor Gaozong permitted Liu Rengui to remain at Baekje. However, the following year (665), as Emperor Gaozong with Empress Wu was preparing for a grand ceremony to make sacrifices to Heaven and Earth at Mount Tai, Liu Rengui returned to Tang along with emissaries from Silla, Tamna, Japan, and the former Baekje, to attend to Emperor Gaozong and Empress Wu during the ceremony. Emperor Gaozong and Empress Wu was pleased by these emissaries' presence, and promoted Liu Rengui to the post of imperial censor, keeping him in the imperial administration. He also gave Liu Rengui the designation Zhi Zhengshi (知政事), making him a de facto chancellor at the suggestion of Empress Wu.

In 666, Liu was promoted to You Xiang (右相) — the head of Xi Tai (西臺), the legislative bureau of the government and a post considered one for a chancellor. He was also made a member of the staff of Emperor Gaozong's son and crown prince, Li Hong. Further, for his battlefield contribution, Emperor Gaozong created him the Baron of Lecheng. However, it was at this time that Liu carried out some actions with regard to an old nemesis, Yuan Yishi—who had earlier tried to force him to commit suicide at Li Yifu's direction—that would bring both praises and comments of his being insincere. Initially, after Liu was first promoted to imperial censor, Yuan, who was thereafter a subordinate, was fearful that Liu would carry out retributions, but at a meeting, Liu poured a cup of wine on the ground and stated, "If I still think of what happened in the past, let me be like this wine." When Liu was promoted to chancellor, he also had Yuan promoted to the post of secretary general of Li Hong's head of household. This brought whispers from many officials, and when Liu heard that people were commenting about it, he further promoted Yuan to the post of chief treasurer at the ministry of finance. One of Liu's subordinates, Du Jianyi (杜簡易), was thereafter recorded to have told others, "This is an intentional overcorrection!" The Song dynasty historian Ouyang Xiu, while generally praising Liu when writing Liu's biography in the New Book of Tang, commented, "As [Liu]'s career advanced from being a local official to being chancellor, he knew how to gain a good reputation and how to please his subordinates." The modern Chinese historian Bo Yang was even more critical.

In 667, Emperor Gaozong launched another campaign aiming to conquer Goguryeo, commanded by the chancellor Li Ji, and in spring 668, during the middle of the campaign, Liu was made Li's deputy. After Goguryeo fell in 669, Liu returned to his post as You Xiang, but sought retirement in 670 on account of illness and old age. Emperor Gaozong agreed to let him retire. However, in 672, Liu was again made chancellor de facto, and in 673 was put in charge of revising the imperial historical records, as prior records, as written by Xu Jingzong, were considered inaccurate.

By 674, Tang and its former ally, Silla, were in constant battle, as Silla's King Munmu had taken over much of former Baekje and Goguryeo territory and fostered resistance against Tang. Emperor Gaozong, in anger, declared King Munmu's brother Kim Immun/Jin Renwen (金仁問) the king of Silla and commissioned Liu with an army to attack Silla. Liu scored some quick victories over Silla, but Emperor Gaozong, not wanting to prolong the confrontation with Silla, ordered Liu to withdraw after King Munmu formally apologized and offered tribute in 675. For Liu's contributions in this campaign, his title was upgraded to Duke of Lecheng, and he and three sons and/or nephews were given the honorific title of Shang Zhuguo (上柱國).

Later that year, Liu and another high-level official, Dai Zhide, were made Puye (僕射), co-heads of the important executive bureau of government (尚書省, Shangshu Sheng). It was said that they rotated listening to the people's petitions on every other day, and that Liu, who often would give the petitioners encouraging words, quickly gained a good reputation among them, while Dai was more careful with his words with them but often advocated for them before the emperor. Nevertheless, because of Liu's words, the common people came to believe that he was capable and Dai was not, and on one occasion, it was recorded that an old lady submitted a petition to Dai, believe that he was Liu, and once she realized her mistake, she yelled at Dai, "I thought I am giving my petition to the Puye who can do things, but instead I am giving it to the useless Puye. Give me back my petition!" Dai laughed and gave her petition back to her.

In 677, facing the increasing threat from Tufan, Emperor Gaozong had Liu command the army stationed at Taohe Base (洮河軍, in modern Haidong Prefecture, Qinghai). However, he soon ran into conflict with another chancellor who remained at the capital -- Li Jingxuan, as his suggestions to Emperor Gaozong were often blocked by Li. To retaliate, Liu, while knowing that Li had no military talent, nevertheless submitted a proposal to Emperor Gaozong that stated that Li would make the best possible general for the coming military action against Tufan, and when Li declined, Emperor Gaozong responded, "If Liu Rengui told me to go, I would go; how can you not go?" Emperor Gaozong had Li take over Liu's post at Taohe, and in fall 678, Li's army suffered a total defeat by Tufan forces, and even Li's deputy Liu Shenli (劉審禮) was captured by Tufan and later died in captivity. Li would eventually be removed from his post by Emperor Gaozong.

In 681, Liu, in addition to his other posts, was made an advisor to Li Zhe, the new crown prince (who had become crown prince after Li Hong's death in 675 and the removal of the next crown prince, Li Xian, in 680). Later that year, Liu resigned his post as head of the executive bureau, but Emperor Gaozong had him remain as chancellor de facto.

In 682, as the Chang'an region was suffering from a famine, Emperor Gaozong and Empress Wu, in order to reduce the pressure on the imperial food supply, took up residence at the eastern capital Luoyang. He left Li Zhe in charge of Chang'an, assisted by Liu and fellow chancellors Pei Yan and Xue Yuanchao. In 683, Emperor Gaozong at the suggestion of Empress Wu, summoned Li Zhe to Luoyang in anticipation that he would soon hold a grand ceremony, also proposed by Empress Wu, to sacrifice to Heaven and Earth at Mount Song, leaving Li Zhe's son Li Chongzhao, the deputy crown prince, nominally in charge of Chang'an, again assisted by Liu, Pei, and Xue. After Li Zhe arrived in Luoyang, Emperor Gaozong, who had long been ill, died around the new year 684. Li Zhe became emperor (as Emperor Zhongzong), and Empress Wu became the empress dowager. The throne was given to Li Zhe, but the imperial seal was given to Empress Dowager Wu (later known as Wu Zetian), and the imperial court was held and directed by her, thus retained the real power over the empire that she exercised alongside (or behind) Emperor Gaozong, and she had exclusive and uncontrollable power.

== During Empress Dowager Wu's regency ==
After Emperor Zhongzong's ascension, Liu Rengui was again made Pushe, and he continued to be in charge at Chang'an, formally assisting Li Chongzhao. Just two months after Emperor Zhongzong took the throne, he had a dispute with Pei Yan over his desire to make his father-in-law Wei Xuanzhen (韋玄貞), the father of his wife Empress Wei, a chancellor, and Empress Dowager Wu, viewing this as a sign of his refusal to submit to her, deposed him and replaced him with his younger brother Li Dan (as Emperor Ruizong) — but the reins of government were by now even more firmly in her hands and not the new emperor's. As part of this move, Li Chongzhao was also deposed, and Liu became in charge of Chang'an in title as well, and Empress Dowager Wu wrote him a letter stating that she was entrusting the Guanzhong region (i.e., Chang'an) to him, just as how Emperor Gao of Han had done so to his prime minister Xiao He. Liu wrote back, offering to resign and citing old age, and further suggested to her that she should return her authorities to the new emperor, pointing out the example of Emperor Gao of Han's wife Empress Lü Zhi—who had controlled the government after his death but whose clan was slaughtered after her death. Empress Dowager Wu wrote back with encouraging words but did not accept his resignation or his suggestion.

In 684, after Li Ji's grandson Li Jingye had started a rebellion and accused Empress Dowager Wu of various crimes, Pei tried to use this as reason to advise Empress Dowager Wu to return imperial authorities to Emperor Ruizong. Instead, Empress Dowager Wu, angry over what she saw as Pei's betrayal, accused him of treason and put him to death. After Pei's death, it happened that a low-level official, Jiang Sizong (姜嗣宗), was in Chang'an, and when Liu asked him about what was happening in Luoyang, Jiang made the remarks, "I had long thought that there was something unusual about Pei." Liu thereafter wrote a petition and gave it to Jiang, asking him to deliver it to Empress Dowager Wu when he returned to Luoyang. Jiang did so, and when Empress Dowager Wu opened up the petition, the petition said, "Jiang Sizong knew that Pei Yan was plotting treason, but did not report it." Empress Dowager Wu immediately had Jiang's limbs broken, and then strangled him. (Ouyang Xiu and Bo Yang both commented on this incident and were critical of Liu—Bo more so than Ouyang, and Bo particularly believed that this showed that Liu's good reputation came from his treachery.) Liu died in spring 685 and was buried with high honors. Empress Dowager Wu had the imperial officials attend his funeral, and had him buried near Emperor Gaozong's tomb.

== Notes and references ==
- Old Book of Tang, ch. 84.
- New Book of Tang, ch. 108.
- Zizhi Tongjian, ch. 200, 201, 202, 203.
