= Buyeo Yong =

South Korean royal (623–668)

- Hangul: 부여용
- Hanja: 扶餘勇
- RR: Buyeo Yong
- MR: Puyŏ Yong

Buyeo Yong (扶餘勇, 623 – 668) was a prince of Baekje, one of the Three Kingdoms of Korea. He was a son of the last king, Uija of Baekje.

In September 663, in the Battle of Baekgang he led the Baekje Revival Army and was defeated by the forces of the Silla–Tang alliance and forced into exile in Goguryeo with his brother, Buyeo Pung. In April 664, he was captured and sent to Ungjin Commandery and the Baekje Revival Movement was destroyed. His later life and activities are unknown but he was probably exiled to China along with his father and other siblings.

One of his brothers, Zenkō (善光 or 禅広), settled in Japan and was given the family name Kudara no Konikishi (百濟王; king of Baekje) by the emperor of Japan.

== See also ==
- History of Korea
- List of monarchs of Korea
- Three Kingdoms of Korea
