= Buyeo Tae =

- Hangul: 부여태
- Hanja: 扶餘泰
- RR: Buyeo Tae
- MR: Puyŏ T'ae

Buyeo Tae (扶餘泰, ? – ?) was a prince of Baekje, one of the Three Kingdoms of Korea. He was the second son of the last king, Uija of Baekje. When Sabi, the capital fell to the Silla–Tang alliance in 660 he fled to Ungjin with his mother the queen.

They went to Busosanseong (Busosan Fortress) where they held out for a short time but there were many that knew that could not withstand the forces of the Silla-Tang alliance and a certain soldier opened up the gate and surrendered to fortress. After this he was taken to Luoyang in China where he disappears from history.

His younger brother, Zenkō (善光 or 禅広), settled in Japan and was given the family name Kudara no Konikishi (百濟王; king of Baekje) by the emperor of Japan.

== Popular culture ==
- Portrayed by Heo Jung-min in the 2012-2013 KBS1 TV series Dream of the Emperor.

== See also ==
- Uija of Baekje
- Silla–Tang alliance
- History of Korea
- Three Kingdoms of Korea
- List of monarchs of Korea
