= Heukchi Sangji =

Chinese general

- Hangul: 흑치상지
- Hanja: 黑齒常之
- RR: Heukchi Sangji
- MR: Hŭkch'i Sangji

Heukchi Sangji, alternatively rendered as Heichi Changzhi (Chinese: 黑齒常之; 630–689), courtesy name Hangwon or Hengyuan (恒元), noble title Duke of Yan (燕國公), was a Chinese military general of Baekje origin. He was a leader of the Baekje restoration movement after Baekje fell in 660 to the Silla–Tang alliance. Thereafter, he became a general of the Tang dynasty.

== Background ==
In 1929 the tomb of Heukchi Sangji was discovered and excavated in Luoyang, China. According to the Samguk Sagi, he was a man of the West Be (Bu, District) in Baekje who had surrendered to the army of the Tang dynasty at the fall of Baekje in 660, and became a distinguished Tang general. The epitaph states that his clan was a collateral branch of the Baekje royal family (Buyeo clan, 扶餘氏) but since their ancestors were enfeoffed with the Heuk-chi country (黑齒國), their descendants took this name. The epitaph also states that the Heukchi clan leaders held the rank of Dalsol (達率, 2nd court rank). According to the epitaph his great-grandfather was named Mundae (文大), his grandfather Deokhyeon (德顯), and his father was Sacha (沙次).

== Baekje restoration movement ==
In 660 a coalition of about 180,000 men of the Silla–Tang alliance led by Tang's Su Dingfang and Silla's Kim Yu-sin attacked Baekje and took the capital of Sabi. Sangji fled with several other generals to the Gangsan Fortress and joined the Baekje restoration movement. He and his followers gathered 30,000 men in 10 days. Tang's Su Dingfang seemed to be eager to defeat him and Baekje people. But he won continuously reoccupying 200 or more castles.

In 663, Silla and Tang counterattacked, and besieged the restoration movement at a fortress known as Juryu Castle (주류성/周留城).At this point Boksin appears to have betrayed the restoration movement. He had Dochim killed and sought to slay Prince Pung as well. However, Pung killed him first, and fled to Goguryeo. The restoration movement was destroyed shortly thereafter at the Battle of Baekgang. During this battle his follower Yong Sak betrayed him for the Tang but Heukchi Sangji kept marching onward defeating several Chinese armies. He surrendered and the Tang appointed him as the Outer General of the Lieutenant's Army and the Yangju Citizen of the Lieutenant's Army.

== General of Tang ==
In 687, when Emperor Ruizong's mother Empress Dowager Wu (later known as Wu Zetian) served as regent, there was an invasion by the Eastern Tujue khan Ashina Gudulu and his general Ashide Yuanzhen (阿史德元珍). Empress Dowager Wu commissioned the ethnically Baekje general Heukchi Sangji, assisted by Li Duozuo, to defend against Ashina Gudulu's attack, and they were able to defeat Eastern Tujue forces at Huanghuadui (黃花堆, in modern Shuozhou, Shanxi), causing Eastern Tujue forces to flee.

== Death ==
But Heukichi and his patron General Zhao felt out of favour from Wu Zetian and the two was sentenced to prison when they were slandered against. Finally, he came to be in chains and sentenced to death in 689.

== In popular culture ==
From 1939 to 1940, Korean writer Hyun Jin-geon wrote a historic novel called Heukchi Sangji, which was a novel created to elevate national sentiments against the Japanese colonial times.

== See also ==
- List of monarchs of Korea
- Great Eight Families
