= Queen Eun'go =

Lady Eun'go

Queen consort of Baekje
- Reign: 641 – 660
- Successor: Dynasty abolished
- Born: before 595; Kingdom of Baekje
- Died: after 660; Empire of Tang
- Spouse: Uija of Baekje

Korean name
- Hangul: 은고
- Hanja: 恩古
- Revised Romanization: Eungo
- McCune–Reischauer: Ŭn'go

Lady Eun'go (Korean: 은고부인; Hanja: 恩古夫人) or called as Grand Lady (Korean: 군대부인; Hanja: 君大夫人), was the last queen consort of Baekje and the only recorded wife of King Uija in history.

Her name is mentioned only once in "Nihon Shoki". After the fall of Baekje by the Silla-Tang alliance, on 13 July 660 (20th years reign of King Uija), Queen Eun'go was captured by Tang general Su Dingfang and sent to Tang, along with her husband, some of his sons, high-level ministers, also at least 88 generals and more than 12,000 civilians. According to the inscription on the Jeongnimsa Temple (대당평백제국비문, 大唐平百濟國碑文) and the Nihon Shoki book, the wife of one of the Baekje's generals played an important role in the fall of the Baekje, but there are claims that General Baekje's wife and Queen Eun'go are the same person in fact.

== In popular culture ==
- Portrayed by Choe Su-ji in the 1992–1993 KBS TV series The Three Kingdoms.
- Portrayed by Ye Soo-jung in the 2006–2007 SBS TV series Yeon Gaesomun.
- Portrayed by Song Ji-hyo, Park Eun-bin, and Jeon Min-seo in the 2011 MBC TV series Gyebaek.
