= Su Dingfang =

Tang dynasty military general (591–667)

Su Lie (Chinese: 蘇烈; 591–667), better known by his courtesy name as Su Dingfang (Chinese: 蘇定方), posthumous name Duke Zhuang of Xing (邢莊公), was a military general of the Tang dynasty who succeeded in destroying the Western Turkic Khaganate in 657. He was born in Wuyi (武邑; in modern-day Hengshui, Hebei). Su Dingfang's victory over the Western Turks expanded the western borders of the Tang dynasty to its farthest extent. He was also instrumental in conquering Baekje in 660.

== Background ==
Su Dingfang was born in 591, during the reign of Emperor Wen of Sui. Toward the end of the reign of Emperor Wen's son and successor Emperor Yang of Sui, the empire was engulfed in agrarian rebellions, and Su Dingfang's father Su Yong (蘇邕) led a local militia in combating the agrarian rebels. Su Dingfang was then in his teenage years, and often served as part of Su Yong's forward troops. After Su Yong died, Su Dingfang took over the militia and continued to battle the agrarian rebels. According to Su Dingfang's biography in the Old Book of Tang, he was the one who defeated and killed one of the major rebel generals, Zhang Jincheng (張金稱), in battle. He also defeated another rebel general, Yang Gongqing (楊公卿).

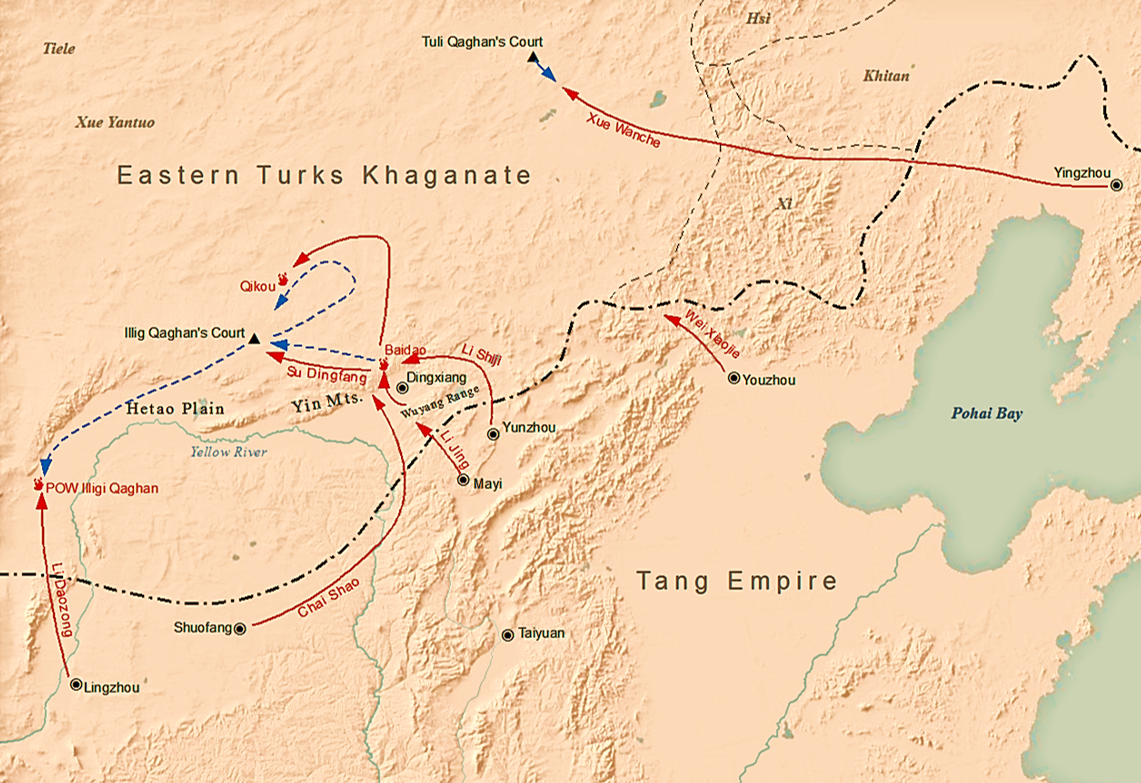
The campaign against Eastern Turks in 630

Su Dingfang later followed the rebel ruler Dou Jiande the Prince of Xia, and he was particularly favored by Dou's major general Gao Yaxian (高雅賢), who treated him like a son. After Dou was defeated and captured by the Tang dynasty general Li Shimin the Prince of Qin (the later Emperor Taizong) in 621, Xia domain was initially taken over by Tang, but Gao and a number of other former Xia generals rose later in the year, supporting the Xia general Liu Heita as the Prince of Handong, and Su served Liu in this campaign of resistance as well. After Gao's death in battle in 622, followed by Liu's defeat by Tang's crown prince Li Jiancheng (Li Shimin's older brother) in 623, Su returned to his home territory.

Sometime after 626 (after Li Shimin became emperor, succeeding his father Emperor Gaozu), Su became a military officer under the prominent general Li Jing. In Li Jing's campaign against Eastern Turkic Khaganate in 629–630, in the final decisive battle where Li Jing crushed the forces of the Jiali Khan Ashina Duobi and killed his wife (Sui's Princess Yicheng) in battle, Su served as Li Jing's forward commander. After Li Jing returned to the Tang capital Chang'an victoriously, Su was promoted to a mid-level officer position.

== Initial service during Emperor Gaozong's reign ==
Little is known about Su Dingfang's career during Emperor Taizong's reign, but as of 655, during the reign of Emperor Taizong's son Emperor Gaozong, six years after Emperor Taizong's death, Su was still described to be at the same rank as he had achieved after the victory over Ashina Duobi. That year, Su served under the general Cheng Minzhen (程名振) in a campaign to harass the border territory of Goguryeo.

Later that year, Emperor Gaozong had the general Cheng Zhijie (程知節) command an army against Western Turkic Khaganate's Shabolüe Khan Ashina Helu, who had previously been a Tang vassal but who had broken away. Su served under Cheng in this campaign. Cheng's campaign was initially enjoying some success against Western Turks' vassal tribes Karluks (歌暹祿), Chuyueh (處月), Turgesh (突騎施), and Chumukun (處木昆). Around the new year 657, Cheng's forces had finally encountered Western Turks' main forces, and initial engagements, where Su led the forward troops, resulted in a victory. However, Cheng's deputy Wang Wendu (王文度) was jealous of Cheng, and ordered that, instead of immediately engaging the rest of Western Turks' troops, as Su advocated, that the forces should be put into a rectangular formation, with the military supplies in the middle. Wang further falsified an order from Emperor Gaozong, transferring the command of the forces from Cheng to him. Su warned Cheng that Wang's refusal to engage Western Turks forces immediately would cause Tang forces to be worn out and pointed out that the order to put Wang in charge must be a forgery—suggesting that Cheng immediately put Wang under arrest and engage Western Turks. Cheng refused. Subsequently, when some Western Turk people surrendered, Wang, in avarice over their property, slaughtered them and took over their property, over Su's objections, and when Wang subsequently gave some of the property to Su, Su refused to accept. At some point, for reasons unknown, Tang troops withdrew, and Wang was discovered to have forged the imperial order, but was only reduced to commoner rank.

== Campaign against Western Turks ==
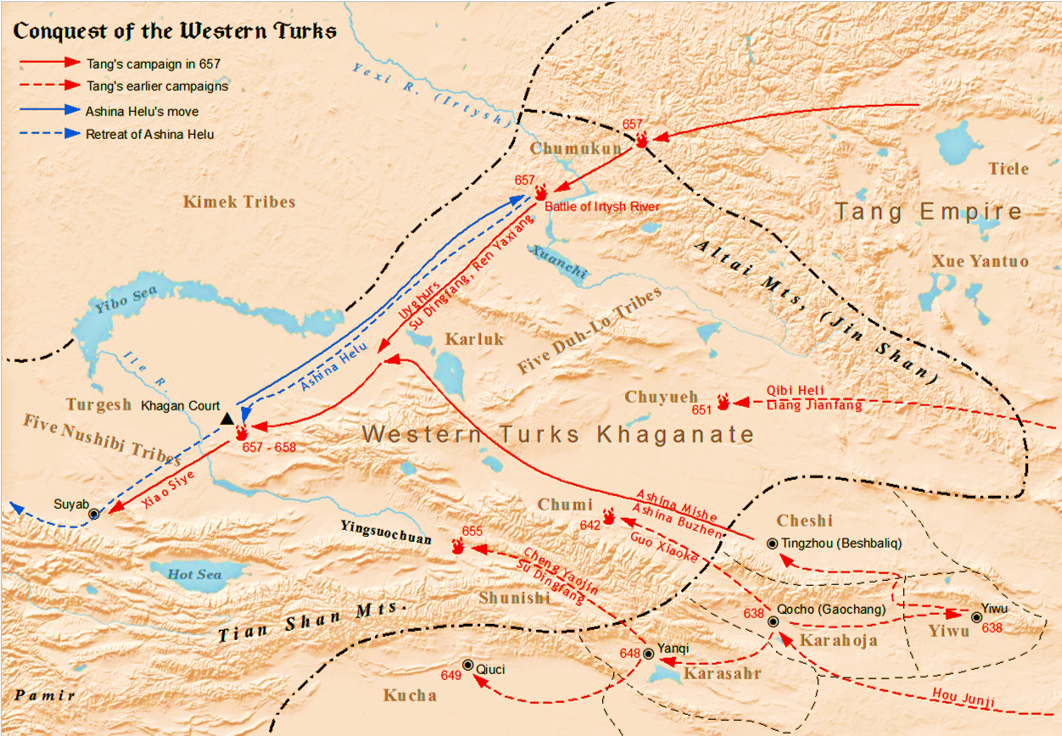
Su Dingfang's campaign against Western Tujue

In spring 657, Emperor Gaozong again launched a campaign against Western Turks, this time with Su Dingfang in command, assisted by the generals Ren Yaxiang and Xiao Siye (蕭嗣業), along with troops from Tang's ally Huige and also Western Turks chiefs Ashina Mishe (阿史那彌射) and Ashina Buzhen (阿史那步真), who took a southern route relative to Su's main forces, which took a northern route. Su first attacked Chumukun, defeating it. Su soon engaged Ashina Helu's army of nearly 100,000 men, with less than 20,000 men himself. Ashina Helu, believing that he could crush Su's smaller army easily, ordered a charge, but could not break through Su's infantry formation, armed with long spears. Su then counterattacked with cavalry, defeating Ashina Helu and killing and capturing several tens of thousands of men. The next day, as Su continued to advance, the commanders of the five western tribes of Western Turks (which consisted of 10 tribes), including the general Huluwu (胡祿屋), surrendered, and Ashina Helu fled along with his general Qulü (屈律). The commanders of the five eastern tribes surrendered to Ashina Buzhen.

As Su continued to advance to chase after Ashina Helu, he encountered snow storms, and when his subordinate generals suggested that they halt until the weather got better, Su pointed out that Ashina Helu would be surprised that they were continuing to chase him through the snow and could thus caught be surprised. He joined forces with Ashina Mishe and Ashina Buzhen, and made a surprise attack on the regrouping Ashina Helu, again defeating him and capturing or killing some tens of thousands of men.

Ashina Helu fled to Shi (石國, modern Tashkent), a vassal of Western Turks, but Shi, not willing to risk being attacked by Tang forces as well, captured and turned Ashina Helu over to Tang forces. The independent Western Turkic Khaganate was no more (although from time to time Tang and Tibet would create members of the royal family khans to try to pacify the region—as it immediately tried to do, creating Ashina Mishe Xingxiwang Khan (興昔亡可汗, literally "the khan who would raise what had been destroyed) and Ashina Mishe Jiwangjue Khan (繼往絕可汗, literally, "the khan who will continue what had been ended"), although Ashina Mishe would eventually be falsely accused of treason by Ashina Buzhen and killed, and after Ashina Buzhen's own death soon thereafter, the scheme fell apart).

When Su presented the captured Ashina Helu to Emperor Gaozong, Emperor Gaozong spared Ashina Helu and promoted Su to be a major general. He also created Su the Duke of Xing, while creating Su's son Su Qingjie (蘇慶節) the Duke of Wuyi.

== Campaign against Sijie ==
In 659, a vassal of Western Turkic Khaganate (Pin. Tujue) Duman (都曼), a commander of the Sijie (思結) tribe, rebelled against Tang suzerainty, along with Western Turkic Khaganate subject kingdoms Shule (疏勒), Zhujubo (朱俱波), and Yebantuo (謁般陀) (all in or near modern Kashgar, Xinjiang). The joint forces commanded by Duman quickly defeated the Tang vassal Yutian (于田, in modern Hotan, Xinjiang). In winter 659, Emperor Gaozong sent Su Dingfang against Duman, and once he arrived in the vicinity of Duman's army, he selected 10,000 infantry soldiers and 3,000 cavalry soldiers and made a surprise attack on Duman. When he arrived at Duman's headquarters, Duman was surprised, and after Su initially defeated Duman, Duman was forced to withdraw within the city. Su put the city under siege, and Duman surrendered. In spring 660, Su took Duman back to the eastern capital Luoyang, where Emperor Gaozong was at the time, to present Duman to him. Some officials requested that Duman be executed, but Su made a plea on Duman's behalf that he had promised Duman life before Duman surrendered, and Emperor Gaozong stated that while under the law Duman should die, he would honor Su's promise, and so he spared Duman.

The Old Tibetan Annals, a document in Classical Tibetan that was discovered at Dunhuang in the early 20th century, mentions another battle that Su Dingfang fought against the Tibetans in 659: "Da Rgyal Mang Po Rjes (Chinese: Dayan Mangbuzhi) fought a battle with Su Dingfang of the Tang at the Dongdai 東岱 (a Tibetan regional administrative unit) of Wuhai 烏海 (southwest of Lake Qinghai). Da Rgyal was killed and his army of 80,000 men was defeated by 1,000 Tang troops." This battle is not mentioned in any other Tang or Tibetan sources.

== Campaign against Baekje ==
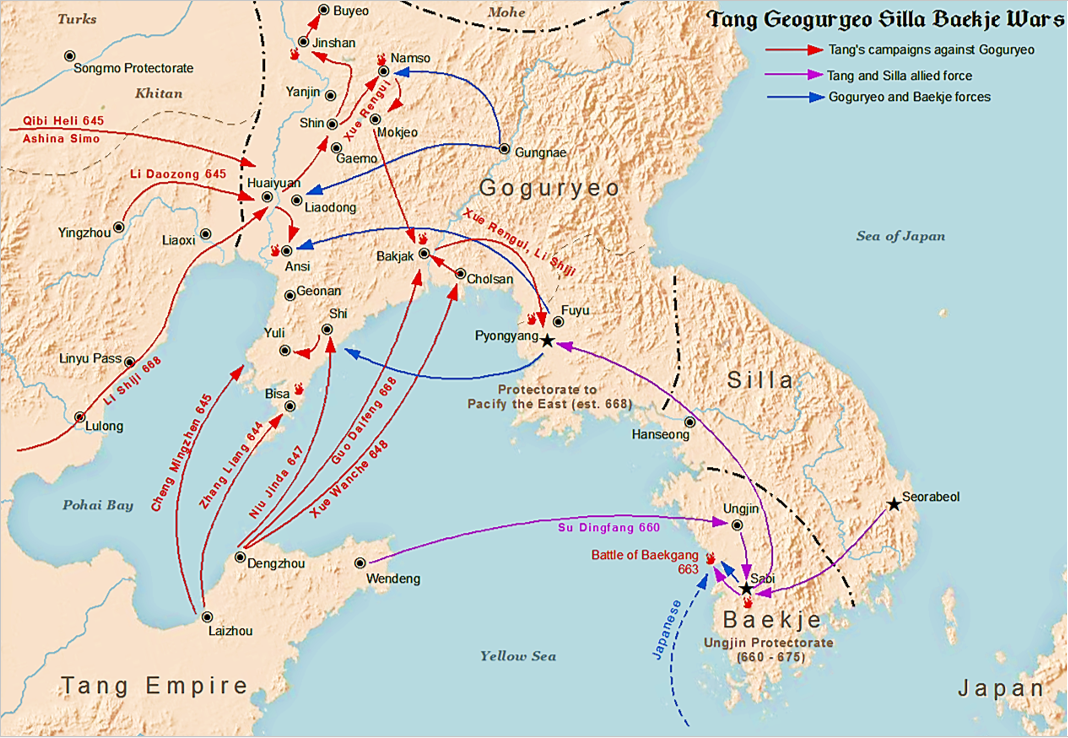
Tang-Silla alliance against Baekje-Japanese alliance. Su was the chief commander of Tang.

Su Dingfang did not remain inactive. Also in spring 660, Tang's ally on the Korean Peninsula, Silla, sought aid from Tang due to attacks from Baekje. Emperor Gaozong put Su in command of a joint army and navy with 100,000 soldiers to attack Baekje, in joint action with Silla's King Muyeol. In summer 660, Su departed from Chengshan (成山, in modern Weihai, Shandong) and crossed the Yellow Sea to Baekje. Baekje forces tried to prevent Tang forces from landing, but could not. Tang forces directly attacked the Baekje capital Sabi and put it under siege. Baekje's King Uija and his crown prince Buyeo Yung fled to the north, and as he did, his second son Buyeo Tae (扶餘泰) declared himself king. Buyeo Yung's son Buyeo Munsa (扶餘文思) pointed out to his father that this meant that even if they were able to repel Tang forces, Tae would kill them, and therefore surrendered. Many people surrendered with Munsa, and Tae was forced to surrender, along with King Uija and Prince Yung. Emperor Gaozong ordered that Baekje's territory be annexed into Tang. In winter 660, Su presented the captives to Emperor Gaozong in Luoyang, and Emperor Gaozong released King Uija and the rest of the captives and declared a general pardon. (It was noted, however, by historians that after the victory, Su's army mistreated the Baekje people, causing them to support a campaign of resistance started by King Uija's son Buyeo Pung, who returned from Japan to claim the throne and to try to re-establish Baekje, which was not fully suppressed until 663. In particular, two Baekje generals, who later would become major generals for Tang after their eventual submission, Heukchi Sangji (黑齒常之) and Sataek Sangyeo (沙吒相如), were described to have resisted Su in light of pillages and killings carried out by Su's forces and were able to successfully hold out against Su's forces.)

== Later activities ==
In winter 660, Emperor Gaozong ordered Su Dingfang, as well as other generals Qibi Heli (契苾何力), Liu Boying (劉伯英), and Cheng Minzhen to attack Baekje's ally Goguryeo. By fall 661, Su had placed Goguryeo's capital Pyongyang under siege. By spring 662, however, after the general Pang Xiaotai (龐孝泰) was defeated and killed in battle with Goguryeo forces and Su could not capture Pyongyang he, faced with problems of severe snow storms, was forced to withdraw.

In summer 663, Tibet launched a major attack against the Tang vassal Tuyuhun. Emperor Gaozong sent Su to lead an army to aid Tuyuhun。 Although there was no further official records at that time of the Tibetans being victorious over Tuyuhun, sources show that a likely battle took place between Su Dingfang's forces and Gar Tongtsen Yulsung in which Tibetan forces were devastated. Some sources even go to suggest that Su Dingfang had retaliated and destroyed the then-Potala Palace. He died in 667.

Liu Xu, the lead editor of the Old Book of Tang, commented in this way about Su:

The Duke of Xing expressed his miraculous strategies, and used forceful tactics to pacify rebels. He was able to achieve successes from the start to the end of his career. Yet the fiefs and promotions he received were too small and did not accord with the institutions of the empire. This was a regrettable oversight.
