= Uija of Baekje =

Last King of Baekje (r. 641–660)

- Hangul: 의자왕
- Hanja: 義慈王
- RR: Uijawang
- MR: Ŭijawang

Uija (595?–660, r. 641–660) was the 31st and final ruler of Baekje, one of the Three Kingdoms of Korea. His reign ended when Baekje was conquered by an alliance of the rival Korean kingdom Silla and China's Tang dynasty.

== Background ==
During this time, the northern Korean kingdom of Goguryeo, under the control of Yŏn Kaesomun, took aggressive stances against Silla and the Tang. Silla responded by eventually allying closely with Tang China, threatening Baekje in the middle.

According to the Samguk sagi, Uija was the eldest son of King Mu. According to a legend in the Samguk yusa, Mu was a Baekje peasant who married Princess Seonhwa of Silla (making her Uija's mother), but this is not considered orthodox history. Uija was made crown prince in January 632 and became king upon his father's death in 641.

== Reign ==
Although friendly with Tang China at first, Uija soon allied with Goguryeo to attack Silla. In 642, he led a campaign against Silla and conquered some 40 castles. He also sent a force of 10,000 to take Silla's Daeya Fortress and kill Kim Chunchu's daughter and son-in-law. The next year, with Goguryeo, Baekje attacked Silla again and tried to block its diplomatic route to Tang China. When Silla-Tang forces attacked Goguryeo in 645, he attacked Silla and took seven castles. Baekje and Goguryeo hit Silla's northern border in 655.

Soon upon becoming king, Uija undertook political reform to control the powers of the aristocracy. However, his reign was plagued by the internal power struggle among the nobles and corruption and decadence within the court.

As the court fell into disarray, the Silla-Tang alliance, repeatedly frustrated by Goguryeo's Yŏn Kaesomun, changed strategy and decided to attack Goguryeo's ally Baekje first.

== Fall of Baekje ==
In 660, Baekje's navy was defeated by Tang's navy, and Silla's army led by Kim Yu-sin defeated Baekje's army led by Gye Baek. Sabi, Baekje's capital, (in present-day Buyeo, South Chungcheong Province) was surrounded by the Silla-Tang allied forces. Uija and the crown prince escaped to Ungjin (in present-day Gongju), but surrendered when Sabi fell.

He was taken to Tang along with his sons Buyeo Hyo and Buyeo Yung, 88 retainers, and 12,807 Baekje peasants. Another of his sons, Buyeo Pung, later attempted to restore his father's kingdom.

In 2000, his remains were retrieved from China and buried in a new tomb in Neungsan-ri, Buyeo County, South Chungcheong Province, South Korea, near what was Baekje's final capital, Sabi.

Uija was his personal name; he did not receive a posthumous name.

== Family ==
- Father: Mu of Baekje
- Mother: Lady Sataek (沙宅王后, ?–642) – daughter of Minister Sataek Jeokdeok (沙宅積德), later became the Empress Dowager Munjeong (文貞太后, 문정태후) during her son's reign.
  - Half brother: Buyeo Gyogi (扶餘翹岐, ?–?) – banished to Japan in 642 along with 40 noblemen and his mother and sister.
  - Queen: Eun'go (穆王后, 恩古) – the wife of Uija is mentioned only in the Japanese Nihon Shoki which claims she was a big reason for Baekje's downfall.
    - Buyeo Yung (扶餘隆, 615–682) – first son, appointed crown prince in 644. He changed his surname to Seo and is known as the progenitor of Buyeo Seo Clan (부여 서씨/扶餘徐氏). He was exiled to China with his father and brothers and died in Luoyang, China. Called Fuyu Ryū in Japan.
    - Buyeo Tae (扶餘泰, ?–?) – second son, exiled to China with father.
    - Buyeo Hyo (扶餘孝, ?–?) – exiled to China with father.
    - Buyeo Yeon (扶餘演, ?–?) – exiled to China with father
    - Buyeo Seon'gwang (Zenkō) (扶餘善光, 621–687) – sent as hostage to Japan in 643 with older brother Pung but he stayed in Japan and was called "Zenkō" and became ancestor of the Kudara no Konikishi clan.
    - Buyeo Pung (扶餘豊, 623–668) – sent as hostage to Japan in 643 with younger brother where they called him Fuyu Hōshō but returned to recover Baekje. Declared king by Gwisil Boksin under the name King Pungjang (豊璋王) but was soon captured and exiled to Southern China.
      - Buyeo Sa (扶餘絲, ?–?) – son of Buyeo Pung who escaped to Japan but was assassinated by Silla agents but is the ancestor of several Japanese clans. He was called Teika-Ō (禎嘉王) in Japan.
    - Buyeo Yong (扶餘勇, ?–?) – led the Baekje revolutionary army along with his brother Pung but was defeated and exiled.
    - Buyeo Chung'seung (扶餘忠勝, ?–?) – took part in the revival movement, fate unknown.
    - Buyeo Chungji (扶餘忠志, ?–?) – took part in the revival movement, fate unknown.

== Popular culture ==
- Portrayed by Ju Seon-Tae in the 1962 Korean film The Way of Hwarang.
- Portrayed by Kil Yong-woo in the 1992–1993 KBS TV series The Three Kingdoms.
- Portrayed by Oh Ji-myeong in the 2003 Korean film Once Upon a Time in a Battlefield.
- Portrayed by Cho Jae-hyun in the 2005–2006 SBS TV series Ballad of Seodong.
- Portrayed by Moon Hoe-won in the 2006–2007 SBS TV series Yeon Gaesomun.
- Portrayed by Choi Won-hong, Noh Young-hak and Cho Jae-hyun in the 2011 KBS1 TV series Gyebaek.
- Portrayed by Lee Jin-woo in the 2012–2013 KBS1 TV series Dream of the Emperor.
- Portrayed by Im Woo Chul in the 2017 KBS TV series Chronicles of Korea.
- Portrayed by Go Young-bin in the 2026–2027 KBS2 TV series Sword & Silence.

== See also ==
- Rulers of Korea
- Three Kingdoms of Korea
- History of Korea
- List of Monarchs of Korea

Uija of Baekje House of Buyeo Cadet branch of the House of Go Born: c. 599 Died: 660
Regnal titles
Preceded by Mu	King of Baekje; 641–660	Succeeded by Buyeo Pung
