= Echi no Takutsu =

Historical Japanese general

Echi no Takutsu (kanji 朴市田来津) was a Yamato general who died in 663 during the Battle of Baekgang.

The Nihon Shoki records that in 661, Naka-no-Oe (soon to be the Emperor Tenji) sent a group of generals to help the country Baekje in its fight against Tang China and the kingdom of Silla. In what could almost be considered a side-note, the text states, "Takutsu, Hada no Miyakko, of Lower Shousen rank..." was sent to help Baekje. Echi no Takutsu is said to have died a heroic death at Baekgang, slaying "tens of men."
