= Buyeo Yung =

- Hangul: 부여융
- Hanja: 扶餘隆
- RR: Buyeo Yung
- MR: Puyŏ Yung

Buyeo Yung (615–682) was the eldest son of King Uija, the last king of Baekje. He was appointed crown prince in 644, and would have been the kingdom's 32nd ruler. He is known as the progenitor of Buyeo Seo Clan (부여 서씨/扶餘徐氏) where he changed his surname to Seo.

After his father was overthrown by an alliance of Silla and the Chinese Tang dynasty in 660, Buyeo Yung was sent into exile at the Tang capital Luoyang, along with his father. After the defeat of the Baekje restoration movement led by Boksin and Dochim at the Battle of Baekgang, which had sought to place Yung's brother Buyeo Pung on the throne, Tang felt the need for a ruler who could pacify the Baekje area. Beginning in 664, Buyeo Yung served briefly as the governor of the Ungjin Commandery (웅진도독부; 熊津都督府) which Tang established to oversee the former territory of Baekje.

After Silla expelled Tang forces from the Korean peninsula in 676, Buyeo Yung returned to Luoyang, where he spent the rest of his days.

== Popular culture ==
- Portrayed by Gong Jung-hwan in the 2012–2013 KBS1 TV series Dream of the Emperor.

== See also ==
- History of Korea
- Three Kingdoms of Korea

Buyeo Yung House of Buyeo Cadet branch of the House of Go Born: 615 Died: 682
Titles in pretence
| Preceded by Buyeo Pung | — TITULAR — King of Baekje; 677–682; Reason for succession failure: Battle of Baekgang | Succeeded by Buyeo Gyeong |
