= Abe no Hirafu =

Japanese military commander, strategist, and politician

- 阿倍 比羅夫
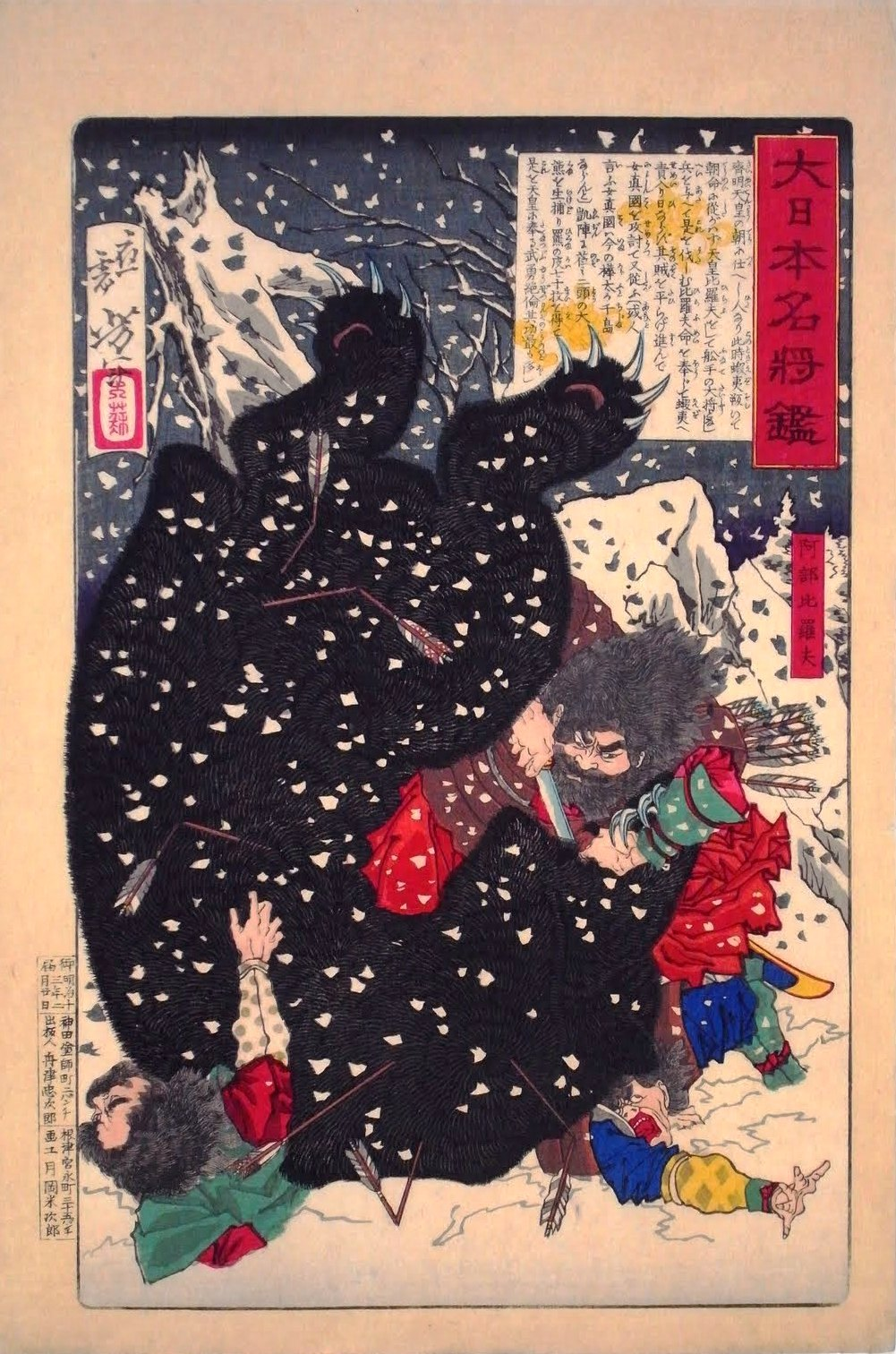
- An ukiyo-e of Abe, 1878
- Occupations: Military commander, strategist, politician
- Years active: 645–664
- Era: Asuka period
- Children: Abe no Sukunamaro, Abe no Yasumaro, Hiketa Hirome, Abe no Funamori
- Father: 阿倍目 (Abe Moku)?

Abe no Hirafu (阿倍 比羅夫) was a Japanese military commander, strategist, and politician of the Asuka period.

Some sources say he lived from c.575–664

== Biography ==
Events in his life are accounted in the Nihon Shoki and Kojiki, both written several decades after his death. His father's name and origin are unknown, as the written sources contradict one another, and may have been altered to glorify the genealogy of then-living clans.

After reaching adulthood, Abe was a governor of Koshi Province. In 658, he defeated the Mishihase in "Watarishima" (which may mean Tsugaru Peninsula or Hokkaido) at the request of the native inhabitants. His men continued to raid and plunder in Hokkaido and Okushiri Island until 660, bringing numerous trophies and prisoners to court. His trophies included at least 2 live bears, 70 bear hides, and 353 prisoners. In March 660, local allies asked for his military assistance at Ishikari River in Hokkaido, where he was victorious again.

In 662 his lord (soon to become the Emperor Tenji) assigned him and the captive prince Buyeo Pung to participate in an expedition to the Korean peninsula to restore the fallen allied kingdom of Baekje. Abe was assigned the command of the rear division out of three divisions available. His division was an entirely naval unit. He arrived on the continent in August 662 and was recalled after the defeat in the Battle of Baekgang in August 663.

Abe no Hirafu might be the ancestor of one or more of the Abe clans, as well as the Ando and Akita clans.

== See also ==
- Mishihase

== Notes and references ==
This article incorporates material from the Japanese Wikipedia page 阿倍比羅夫, accessed 27 July 2017
