= Dochim =

Korean Buddhist monk (fl. 7th century)

- Hangul: 도침
- Hanja: 道琛
- RR: Dochim
- MR: Toch'im

Dochim (Korean: 도침; died 661) was a Buddhist monk of Baekje, one of the Three Kingdoms of Korea. He is remembered primarily as a leader of a movement for the restoration of Baekje after the kingdom fell in 660 along with Gwisil Boksin.

In 660, Baekje was attacked by the allied armies of Silla and the Tang dynasty of China. The capital, Sabi, was taken, but Gwisil Boksin resisted near modern-day Yesan. After King Uija's surrender to the Tang dynasty, Boksin and the monk Dochim kindled a restoration movement. They sent for the prince Buyeo Pung, who had been living as a hostage in Yamato period Japan, an important Baekje ally. With some Japanese aid, they gathered the remnants of the Baekje army and launched a series of attacks on the Silla-Tang forces.

In 663, Silla and Tang counterattacked, and besieged the restoration movement at a fortress known as Juryu Castle (주류성/周留城). At this point Boksin appears to have betrayed the restoration movement. He had Dochim killed and sought to slay Prince Pung as well. However, Pung killed him first, and fled to Goguryeo. The restoration movement was destroyed shortly thereafter at the Battle of Baekgang.
