= Goguryeo–Tang War =

Invasion of Goguryeo by Tang dynasty (645–668)

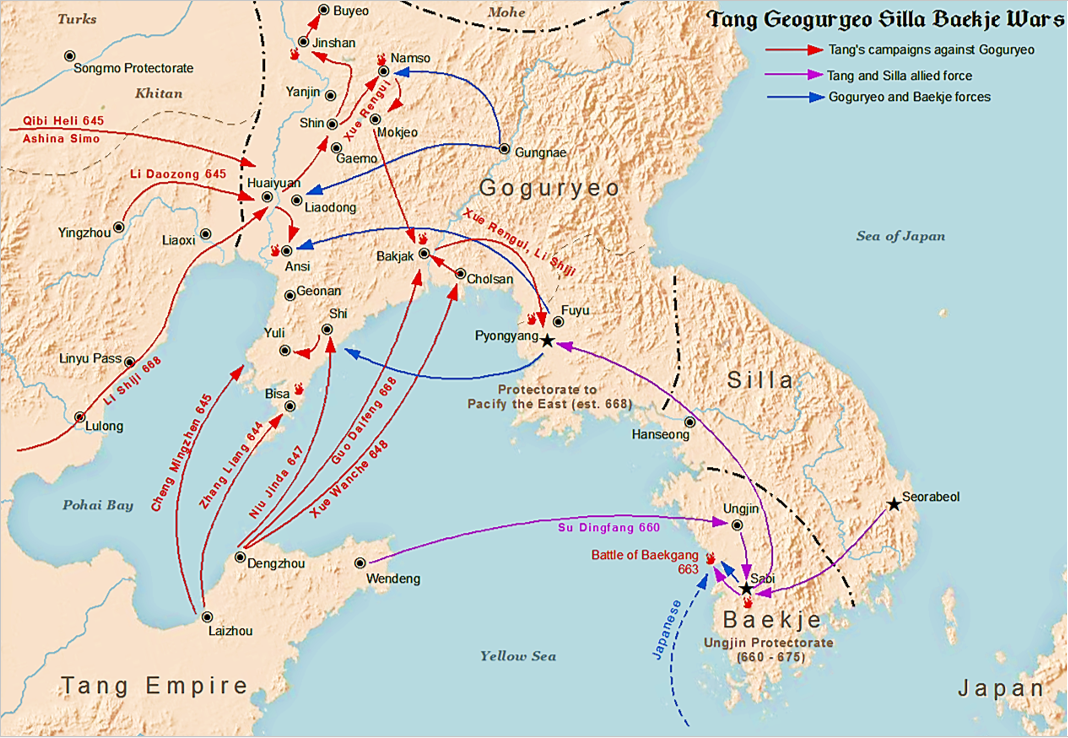
Date	645–668
Location	Liaodong Peninsula, Northern Korean Peninsula, Bohai Sea, and Yellow Sea
Result	Tang-Silla coalition victory
Territorial changes	Fall of Goguryeo; Annexation of Goguryeo by Tang; End of the Three Kingdoms of Korea; Establishment of Andong Protectorate; Goguryeo and Baekje swear fealty to Silla, thereby forming Unified Silla; Beginning of territorial disputes between Silla and Tang

Belligerents
Tang; Silla	Goguryeo; Baekje; Yamato Japan (Battle of Baekgang)

Commanders and leaders
Tang: Emperor Taizong (645–649); Emperor Gaozong (649–668); Silla: Queen Seondeok (645–647); Queen Jindeok (647–654); King Muyeol (654–661); King Munmu (661–668); Turkic: Qilibi Khan; Qibi Heli; Ashina Buzhen	Goguryeo: Generalissimo Yŏn Kaesomun; King Bojang; Baekje: King Uija (645–660, independent kingdom); Prince Buyeo Yung (660–663, restoration movement); Yamato: Emperor Tenji; Empress Saimei

Goguryeo–Tang War

Chinese name
- Traditional Chinese: 唐與高句麗的戰爭
- Simplified Chinese: 唐与高句丽的战争
Transcriptions
Standard Mandarin
- Hanyu Pinyin: Táng yǔ Gāojùlì de zhànzhēng

Korean name
- Hangul: 고구려-당 전쟁
Transcriptions
- Revised Romanization: Goguryeo-Dang jeonjaeng
- McCune–Reischauer: Koguryŏ-Tang chŏnjaeng

The Goguryeo–Tang War occurred from 645 to 668 and was fought between Goguryeo and the Tang dynasty. During the course of the war, the two sides allied with various other states. Goguryeo successfully repulsed the invading Tang armies during the first Tang invasions of 645–648. After conquering Baekje in 660, Tang and Silla armies invaded Goguryeo from the north and south in 661, but were forced to withdraw in 662. In 666, Yŏn Kaesomun died and Goguryeo became plagued by violent dissension, numerous defections, and widespread demoralization. The Tang–Silla alliance mounted a fresh invasion in the following year, aided by the defector Yŏn Namsaeng. In late 668, exhausted from numerous military attacks and suffering from internal political chaos, Goguryeo and the remnants of Baekje army succumbed to the numerically superior armies of the Tang dynasty and Silla.

The war marked the end of the Three Kingdoms of Korea period which had lasted since 57 BC. It also triggered the Silla–Tang War during which the Silla Kingdom and the Tang Empire fought over the spoils they had gained.

== Onset ==
Silla had made numerous requests to the Tang court for military assistance against the Kingdom of Goguryeo, which the Tang court began to consider not long after they had decisively defeated the Göktürks in 628. At the same time, however, Silla was also engaged in open hostilities with Baekje in 642. A year before in 641, King Uija had assumed the throne of Baekje. In 642, King Uija attacked Silla and captured around 40 strongpoints. Meanwhile, in 642, the military dictator Yŏn Kaesomun murdered over 180 Goguryeo aristocrats and seized the Goguryeo throne. He placed a puppet king onto the throne after killing the king in 642. These newly formed governments in Baekje and Goguryeo were preparing for war and had established a mutual alliance against Tang and Silla.

== Course of the war ==
=== Conflict in 645 ===
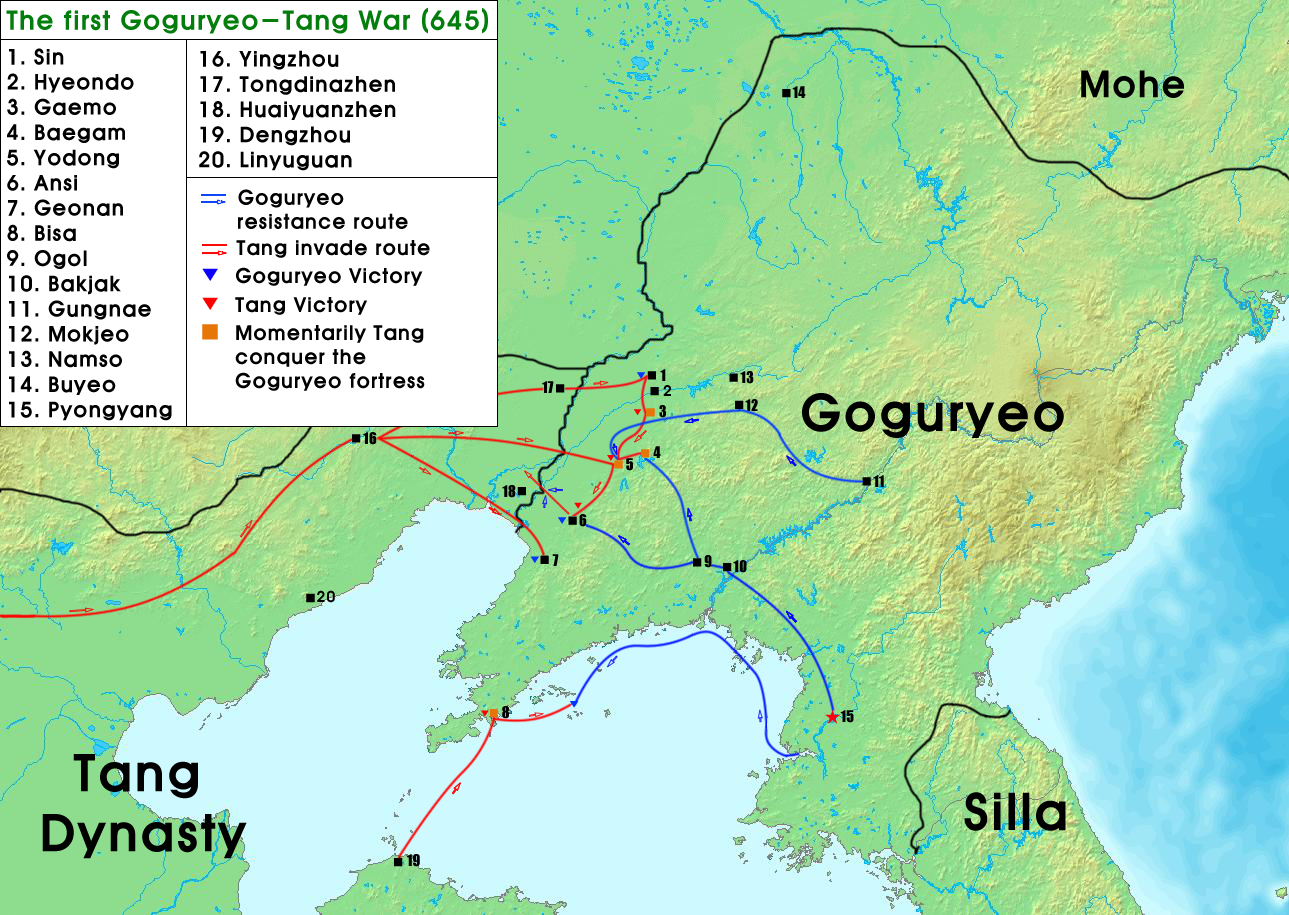
First conflict of the Goguryeo-Tang War

Emperor Taizong of Tang used Yŏn Kaesomun's murder of King Yeongnyu of Goguryeo as the pretext for his campaign and started preparations for an invasion force in 644. General Li Shiji commanded an army of 60,000 Tang soldiers and an undisclosed number of tribal forces which gathered at Youzhou. Emperor Taizong commanded an armored cavalry force of 10,000, which eventually met up and joined general Li Shiji's army during the expedition. A fleet of 500 ships also transported an additional 40,000 conscripted soldiers and 3,000 military gentlemen (volunteers from the elite of Chang'an and Luoyang). This fleet sailed from the Liaodong Peninsula to the Korean Peninsula.

In April 645, general Li Shiji's army departed from Yincheng (present-day Chaoyang). On 1 May, they crossed the Liao River into Goguryeo territory. On 16 May, they laid siege to Gaimou (Kaemo), which fell after only 11 days, capturing 20,000 people and confiscating 100,000 shi (6 million liters) of grain.

Afterwards, general Li Shiji's army advanced to Liaodong (Ryotong). On 7 June, they crushed a Goguryeo army of 40,000 troops that had been sent to the city to relieve it from the Tang siege. A few days later, Emperor Taizong's cavalry arrived at Liaodong. On 16 June, the Tang army successfully set Liaodong ablaze with incendiary projectiles and breached its defensive walls, resulting in the fall of Liaodong to the Tang forces.

The Tang army marched further to Baiyan (Paekam) and arrived there on 27 June. However, the Goguryeo commanders surrendered the city to the Tang army. Afterwards, Emperor Taizong ordered that the city must not be looted and its citizens must not be enslaved.

On 18 July, the Tang army arrived at Ansi Fortress. A Goguryeo army, including Mohe troops, were sent to relieve the city. The reinforcing Goguryeo army totaled 150,000 troops. However, Emperor Taizong sent general Li Shiji with 15,000 troops to lure the Goguryeo forces. Meanwhile, another Tang force secretly flanked the Goguryeo troops from behind. On 20 July, the two sides met at the Battle of Jupilsan and the Tang army came out victorious. Most of the Goguryeo troops dispersed after their defeat. The remaining Goguryeo troops fled to a nearby hill, but they surrendered the next day after a Tang encirclement.

The Tang forces took 36,800 troops captive. Of these prisoners, the Tang forces sent 3,500 officers and chieftains to China, executed 3,300 Mohe troops, and eventually released the rest of the ordinary Goguryeo soldiers. However, the Tang army could not breach into the city of Ansi, which was defended by the forces of Yang Manch'un. Tang troops attacked the fortress as many as six or seven times per day, but the defenders repulsed them each time. After weeks passed, Emperor Taizong considered abandoning the siege of Ansi to advance deeper into Goguryeo, but Ansi was deemed to pose too great of a threat to abandon during the expedition. Eventually, the Tang staked everything on the construction of a huge mound, but it was captured and successfully held by the defenders despite three days of frantic assaults by Tang troops.

Facing worsened conditions for the Tang army due to cold weather (winter was approaching) and diminishing provisions, Emperor Taizong was compelled to order a withdrawal from Goguryeo on October 13. He left behind an extravagant gift for the commander of Ansi Fortress. Tang Taizong's retreat was difficult and many of his soldiers died. Taizong himself tended to the injuries of the Göktürk generals Qibi Heli and Ashina Simo, who were both wounded during the campaign against Goguryeo.

=== Conflicts in 654–668 and fall of Goguryeo ===
Under Emperor Gaozong's reign, the Tang Empire formed a military alliance with Silla. When Goguryeo and Baekje attacked Silla from the north and west respectively, Queen Seondeok of Silla sent an emissary to the Tang Empire to request military assistance. In 650, Emperor Gaozong received a poem, written by Queen Jindeok of Silla, from the princely emissary Kim Chunchu, who would later accede the Silla throne as King Muyeol. In 653, Baekje allied with Yamato Wa. Even though Baekje was allied with Goguryeo, the Han River valley separated the two states and was a hindrance in coming to each other's aid in time of war. King Muyeol assumed the Silla throne in 654. Between 655 and 659, the border of Silla was harassed by Baekje and Goguryeo; Silla therefore requested assistance from Tang. In 658, Emperor Gaozong sent an army to attack Goguryeo but was unable to overcome Goguryeo's stalwart defenses. King Muyeol suggested to Tang that the Tang–Silla alliance first conquer Baekje, breaking up the Goguryeo–Baekje alliance, and then attack Goguryeo.

In 660, the Tang Empire and the Silla Kingdom sent their allied armies to conquer Baekje. The Baekje capital Sabi fell to the forces of Tang and Silla. Baekje was conquered on 18 July 660, when King Uija of Baekje surrendered at Ungjin. The Tang army took the king, the crown prince, 93 officials, and 20,000 troops as prisoners. The king and the crown prince were sent as hostages to the Tang Empire. The Tang Empire annexed the territory and established five military administrations to control the region instead of Silla, which was painfully accepted.

In a final effort, general Gwisil Boksin led continued resistance against Tang occupation of Baekje. He requested military assistance from Yamato allies. The Nihongi Chronicles notes that during his pleas for Yamato assistance, Prince Buyeo Pung was conferred the cap of shiki given the younger sister of Komoshi Oho no Omi to wed. Emperor Tenji of Japan sent Ajimasa Sawi no Muraji of Lower Daisen Rank, and Takutsu Hada no Miyakko, in command of four thousand men to escort Prince Buyeo Pung back to his country where General Gwisil Boksin met and entrusted the governance of the land to the prince. The Tang fleet, comprising 170 ships, advanced towards Chuyu and encircled the city at the Baekgang River. As the Yamato fleet engaged the Tang fleet, they were attacked by the Tang fleet and were destroyed. In 663, the Baekje resistance and Yamato forces were annihilated by the Tang and Silla forces at the Battle of Baekgang. Subsequently, Prince Buyeo Pung of Baekje and his remaining men fled to Goguryeo. The natives rebelled and besieged Liu Renyuan in the capital until Liu Rengui could bring in reinforcements. A stalemate ensued, with Baekje holding some cities while Silla and the Tang occupied others. In the autumn of 663, a combined Tang-Silla army marched for Chuyu, the capital of the rebels. Chuyu was captured on 14 October and the rebellion was vanquished.

In the summer of 661, Su Dingfang led an army of 44,000 across the sea and laid siege to Pyongyang while another Tang army under Qibi Heli advanced overland. The Tang army was 350,000 strong and Silla was only requested to provide supplies during this expedition. Qibi Heli defeated a Goguryeo army at the Yalu River but Su Dingfang failed to take Pyongyang. The invasion was called off in February 662 after failing to take Pyongyang for several months and when a subsidiary Tang force led by Pang Xiaotai was defeated by Yŏn Kaesomun at the Battle of Sasu.

In 666, the Goguryeo dictator Yŏn Kaesomun died and an internal struggle between his sons for power broke out. Goguryeo was weakened by the succession struggle among his sons and younger brother. His eldest son (and successor) defected to Tang and his younger brother defected to Silla. The violent dissension resulting from Yŏn Kaesomun's death proved to be the primary reason for the Tang–Silla triumph, thanks to the division, defections, and widespread demoralization it caused.

Yŏn Kaesomun's death paved the way for a fresh invasion by Tang and Silla in 667, this time aided by Yŏn Kaesomun's oldest son. The alliance with Silla also proved to be invaluable, thanks to the ability to attack Goguryeo from opposite directions, and both military and logistical aid from Silla. In early 667, a Tang invasion of Goguryeo was launched with Li Shiji at its head. The Tang army swept away the border fortifications and pressed into Goguryeo's heartland in the spring of 668. Tang and Silla forces besieged and conquered Pyongyang on 22 October and the Tang annexed Goguryeo. Over 200,000 prisoners were taken by the Tang forces and sent to Chang'an.

== Aftermath ==
In 669, the Tang government established the Protectorate General to Pacify the East to control the former territories of Goguryeo. A subordinate office was placed in Baekje. By the end of the war, the Tang Empire had taken control over the former territories of Baekje and Goguryeo and tried to assert dominion over Silla. Large parts of the Korean Peninsula were occupied by the Tang forces for about a decade.

However, the Tang occupation of the Korean Peninsula proved to be logistically difficult due to shortage of supplies which Silla had provided previously. Furthermore, Emperor Gaozong was ailing, so Empress Wu took a pacifist policy, and the Tang Empire was diverting resources towards other priorities. This situation favored Silla, because soon Silla would have to forcibly resist the imposition of Chinese rule over the entire peninsula. War was imminent between Silla and Tang.

== Bibliography ==
- Ebrey, Patricia Buckley; Walthall, Anne; Palais, James B. (2006). East Asia: A cultural, social, and political history. Boston: Houghton Mifflin. ISBN 9780618133840.
- Farris, William Wayne (1985). Population, disease, and land in early Japan, 645–900. Cambridge: Harvard University Press. ISBN 9780674690059.
- Fuqua, Jacques L. (2007). Nuclear endgame: The need for engagement with North Korea. Westport: Praeger Security International. ISBN 9780275990749.
- Graff, David A. (2002). Medieval Chinese Warfare, 300–900. London: Routledge. ISBN 9780415239554.
- Joe, Wanne J. (1972). Traditional Korea: A Cultural History. Seoul: Chung'ang University Press.
- Kim, Djun Kil (2005). The history of Korea (1st ed.). Westport: Greenwood Press. ISBN 9780313038532.
- Lee, Kenneth B. (1997). Korea and East Asia: The story of a phoenix. Westport: Praeger. ISBN 9780275958237.
- Lewis, Mark Edward (2009). China's cosmopolitan empire: The Tang dynasty. Cambridge: Harvard University Press. ISBN 9780674033061.
- Ota, Fumio (2012). "The Japanese way of war". The Oxford handbook on war. Corby: Oxford University Press. ISBN 9780199562930.
- Seth, Michael J. (2010). A history of Korea: From antiquity to the present. Lanham: Rowman & Littlefield. ISBN 9780742567177.
- Wang, Zhenping (2013). Tang China in Multi-Polar Asia: A History of Diplomacy and War. University of Hawaii Press.
- West, Barbara A. (2009). Encyclopedia of the peoples of Asia and Oceania. New York: Facts On File. ISBN 9781438119137.
- Yu, Chai-Shin (2012). The new history of Korean civilization. Bloomington: iUniverse. ISBN 9781462055593.
