= Battle of Baekgang =

663 battle of Goguryeo–Tang War

Coordinates: 36.0000°N 126.6670°E

- Part of Goguryeo–Tang War
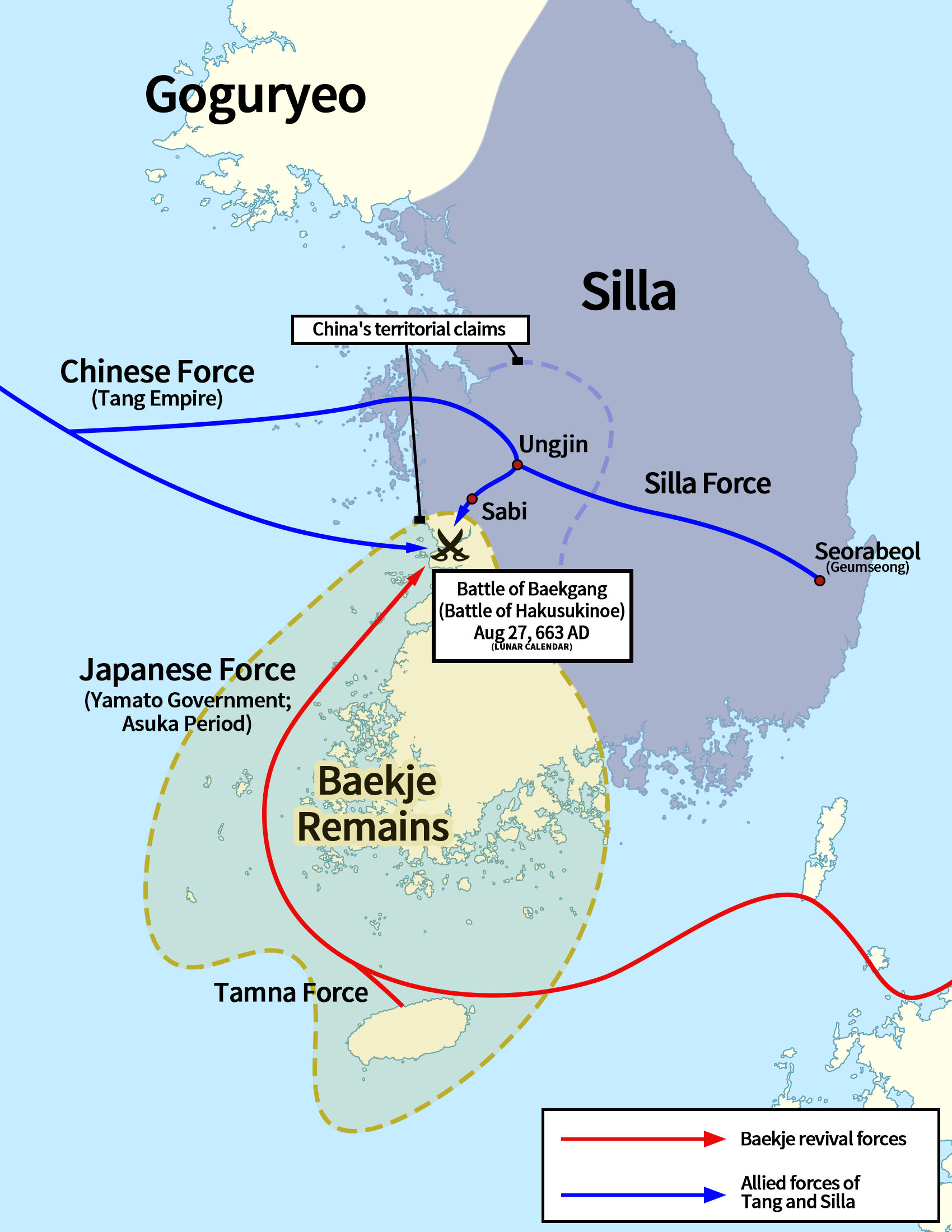
Date	27–28 August 663 (of the Lunar calendar); 4–5 October 663 (of the Julian calendar)
Location	Baengma River (Lower reaches of the Geum River), Korea
Result	Tang–Silla alliance victory
Territorial changes	Paekche falls and is absorbed by the alliance, Tamna withdraws from the mainland, and Yamato cuts ties with Silla.

Belligerents
Tang (China); Silla (Korea)	Yamato (Japan); Paekche (Korea); Tamna (Korea)

Commanders and leaders
Su Dingfang	Abe no Hirafu; Echi no Takutsu †; Buyeo Pung

Strength
13,000 Tang troops; 170 Tang ships; Unknown number of Silla support cavalry	42,000 Yamato troops; 800 Yamato ships; Unknown number of Paekche restoration troops; Unknown number of Tamna restoration troops

Casualties and losses
Unknown	400 ships; 10,000 troops; 1,000 horses

- Battle of Baekgang
- Hangul: 백강 전투
- Hanja: 白江戰鬪
- RR: Baekgang jeontu
- MR: Paekkang chŏnt'u

The Battle of Baekgang (Korean: 백강 전투; Hanja: 白江戰鬪) or Battle of Baekgang-gu, also known as the Battle of Hakusukinoe (Japanese: 白村江の戦い, romanized: Hakusuki-no-e no Tatakai / Hakusonkō no Tatakai) (Note: According to the Nihon Kokugo Daijiten and the Kōjien, suki means "village" in "old/ancient Korean". The entry for suki in the Kokugo Daijiten uses the spelling in katakana, スキ, to reflect the fact that it's a foreign word.) in Japan, and as the Battle of Baijiangkou (Chinese: 白江口之战; Chinese: 白江口之戰; pinyin: Bāijiāngkǒu Zhīzhàn) in China, was a battle between Paekche restoration forces and their ally Yamato Japan against the allied forces of Silla and Tang China. The battle took place on 27–28 August 663 (of the Lunar calendar; 4–5 October 663 of the Julian calendar) in the Baengma River (Korean: 백마강; Hanja: 白馬江) or Baek River (Korean: 백강; Hanja: 白江), which is the lower reach of the Geum River in Jeollabuk-do province, Korea. The Silla-Tang forces won a decisive victory, compelling Yamato Japan to withdraw completely from Korean affairs and crushing the Paekche restoration movement.

== Background ==
In the first half of the first millennium CE, the Korean Peninsula was divided into three kingdoms – Paekche, Silla, and Goguryeo. These three kingdoms were rivals, and had engaged each other in wars for dominion over the peninsula for several centuries. In addition to the inter-Korean rivalry, Goguryeo had been engaged in frequent warfare with the Chinese Sui and Tang dynasties. While the three Korean kingdoms were not always military enemies, their alliances frequently shifted. For example, Silla and Paekche were allied against Goguryeo from the late 420s to the early 550s. Later in 553, Silla betrayed its former ally and wrested control of the entire Han River basin from Paekche.

In 660, the coalition troops of Silla and Tang China attacked Paekche, resulting in the annexation of Paekche by Silla. A Buddhist monk Dochim (도침; 道琛) and the former Paekche general Buyeo Boksin rose to try to restore their country. They welcomed the Paekche prince Buyeo Pung back from Japan to serve as king, with Juryu (주류, 周留, in modern Seocheon County, South Chungcheong) as their headquarters. Although Paekche restoration forces had some initial success against Tang and Silla troops, by 662, they were in serious trouble, and their area of control was confined to the fortress of Churyu and its immediate vicinity. As their situation went from bad to worse, Buyeo Pung had Gwisil Boksin killed for fear of insurrection.

Paekche and Yamato Japan had been long-standing allies by this time, and their royal houses were related, so Paekche royals resided in Japan throughout the centuries as a token of goodwill to ask for favors from Japan, but also acting as spies (but only when Paekche was eliminated were Princes Buyeo Pung and his brother, and no other Paekche royal prior, came to be listed in the Nihon Shoki as "hostages." Of note, there have also been cases of Nihon Shoki deliberately recording visiting foreign diplomats as "hostages" such as King Muyeol of Silla who entered and left Japan for a diplomatic mission with China without being waylain, in but a span of few months). The fall of Paekche in 660 came as a terrible shock to the Yamato royal court. Empress Kōgyoku said:

"We learn that in ancient times there have been cases of troops being asked for and assistance requested: to render help in emergencies, and to restore that which has been interrupted, is a manifestation of ordinary principles of right. The Land of Paekche, in its extremity, has come to us and placed itself in our hands. Our resolution in this matter is unshakable. We will give separate orders to our generals to advance at the same time by a hundred routes."

Crown Prince Naka no Ōe, later to become Emperor Tenji, and Empress Kōgyoku decided to dispatch an expeditionary force led by Abe no Hirafu to help the besieged Paekche restoration forces. The troops were largely local strongmen (kuni no miyatsuko) drawn from mostly western Honshū, Shikoku, and especially Kyūshū, although some warriors were also from Kantō and northeastern Japan.

Empress Kōgyoku moved the capital to the Asakura temporary palace near the shipyards in northern Kyūshū to personally oversee the military campaign. As the main fleet set sail, the Man'yōshū records Empress Kōgyoku composing a waka:

熟田津に 船乗りせむと 月待てば 潮もかなひぬ 今は漕ぎ出でな
Nikita tsu ni funanori semu to tsuki mateba, shio mo kanahinu: ima ha kogiide na.
I was going to wait for the moon to rise before embarking from Nikita bay, but the tide is up: go, row out now!

Around August 661, 5,000 soldiers, 170 ships, and the general Abe no Hirafu all arrived in territory controlled by the Paekche restoration forces. Additional Japanese reinforcements, including 27,000 soldiers led by Kamitsukeno no Kimi Wakako (上毛野君稚子) and 10,000 soldiers led by Iohara no Kimi (廬原君), arrived in 662.

== Battle ==
In 663, Paekche restoration forces and the Yamato navy convened in southern Paekche with the intent to relieve the capital of the Paekche restoration movement in Churyu, which was under siege by Silla forces. The Yamato navy was to ferry ground troops to Churyu via the Geum River and lift the siege. However, Tang also sent 7,000 soldiers and 170 ships to blockade Yamato reinforcements from relieving the capital.

On 4 October 663 (27 August by the lunar calendar), the advance guard of the Japanese fleet tried to force their way, but using common doctrine and strong formation, the Tang ships held firm, repelling the attacks and displaying greater tactical sophistication than the Japanese fleet.

On 5 October 663 (28 August by the lunar calendar), the second day of the battle, the arrival of Japanese reinforcements made their forces several times larger than the Tang fleet arrayed against them. However, the river was narrow enough where the Tang fleet could cover their front and protect their flanks as long as they maintained their ordered battle lines. The Japanese were confident in their numerical superiority and attacked the Tang fleet at least three times throughout the entire day, but the Tang fought off each attack. Towards the end of the day, the Japanese became exhausted, and their fleet lost cohesion through their repeated attempts to break through Tang lines. Sensing the right moment, the Tang fleet moved reserves and counterattacked, breaking both the left and right flanks of the Japanese, enveloping their fleet and crowding in the ships so they could not move or retreat. Many Japanese fell into the water and drowned, and many of their ships were burned and sunk. The Yamato general Echi no Takutsu was killed after striking down more than a dozen men in close quarters combat.

Japanese, Korean, and Chinese sources all point to heavy Japanese casualties. According to the Nihon Shoki, 400 Japanese ships were lost in the battle.

== Retrospective discussions ==
In recent times, many scholars are puzzled over the reasons behind Yamato going through much effort to protect Paekche, a foreign kingdom. Author Bruce Batten remarked:

"Why the Japanese should have thrown themselves with such vigor into a war that, if not quite an intramural Korean conflict, had at least no direct bearing on Japanese territory, is not easy to answer."

The battle, as well as all the preparation behind it, is believed to illustrate (aside from any other documentation) the strong ties between Yamato Japan and Paekche of Korea transcending the usual interstate military, political, or economic interests. Linguist J. Marshall Unger suggests, based on linguistic evidence, that Paekche could represent a remnant proto-Japanese or para-Japanese community, which had stayed behind on the Korean peninsula after the Yayoi migrations, but still maintained a conscious connection to the Yayoi people and their descendants. Regardless, the phenomenon of elite refugees fleeing political conflict on the peninsula and settling in Yamato had been recurring in waves since at least the 5th century.

Another theory is that Yamato wanted to keep an ally on the Korean peninsula that was on good terms with them. Following the Silla–Goguryeo and Kaya–Paekche–Wa War and with the fall of Kaya confederacy to Silla in 562, the Yamato Kingship must have faced a dilemma on whether or not to participate in a full-scale war, something Japan never experienced prior to the Battle of Baekgang. However, since Silla-Wa hostility was at its all-time high and with Kaya gone, Yamato ultimately decided to aid Paekche, their last remaining ally in East Asia, and reinstate Buyeo Pung, the last heir of Paekche as king. However, this preparation did not come easy within Japan. Prior to the Isshi incident, the most powerful clan, the Soga clan, was reluctant about participating in foreign battles, and it was only when Prince Naka no Ōe (Emperor Tenji) and Nakatomi no Kamatari (Fujiwara no Kamatari) assassinated Soga no Iruka and came into power did Japan become proactive in aiding Paekche. In fact, due to much overlap within historical records, recent analysis theorize that Buyeo Pung and Fujiwara no Kamatari were the same individual, hence why they were heavily invested in reviving Paekche despite all odds.

== See also ==
- Naval history of Korea
- Naval history of China
- Naval history of Japan
- Largest naval battle in history

== Bibliography ==
- Aston, W. G. (translated by) 1972 Nihongi: Chronicles of Japan from the Earliest Times to A.D. 697. Published by Charles E. Tuttle Company: Tokyo, Japan.
- Ebrey, Patricia Buckley; Walthall, Anne; Palais, James B. (2006), East Asia: A Cultural, Social, and Political History, Boston: Houghton Mifflin, ISBN 978-0-618-13384-0
- Farris, William Wayne 1995 Heavenly Warriors: The Evolution of Japan's Military, 500–1300 AD. United States: Published by The Council on East Asian Studies, Harvard University, Cambridge.
- Jamieson, John Charles. The Samguk sagi and the Unification Wars. Ph.D. dissertation, University of California, Berkeley, 1969.
