= Gwisil Boksin =

Baekje general (fl. 7th century)

- Hangul: 귀실복신
- Hanja: 鬼室福信
- RR: Gwisil Boksin
- MR: Kwisil Poksin

Gwisil Boksin (鬼室福信, ? – 663) was a military general of Baekje, one of the Three Kingdoms of Korea. He is remembered primarily as a leader of the Baekje Revival Movement to restore the kingdom after the capital fell in 660 to the Silla–Tang alliance.

== Background ==
The Gwisil clan was a collateral branch of the royal family descending from a younger son of the 26th king, Seong of Baekje. Boksin was therefore a distant cousin of Baekje's last recognized king, Uija of Baekje. His father was named Gwisil Jeongin (鬼室貞仁) and seems to be the first to take the name "Gwisil". His name is also romanized as "Kwisil Poksin" and in Japan his name is read "Kishitsu Fukushin". As a relative to the royal family he held the highest rank in court as a minister (Sahe, 佐平).

The earliest mention of him is dated August 627 when a certain 'nephew' of King Mu of Baekje named Boksin (福信) or Shinbok (信福) is dispatched as an envoy to the court of the Tang dynasty. At this time he held the rank of Dalsol (達率, 2nd court rank). Emperor Taizong of Tang dictated that Baekje and Goguryeo would stop their attacks on Silla but in February, 628 Baekje underwent a military coup and they attacked Silla, breaking the agreement.

== Fall of Baekje ==
In 660, Baekje was attacked by the allied armies of Silla and Tang dynasty China. The capital, Sabi, was taken, but Boksin resisted near modern-day Yesan. After King Uija's surrender to Tang dynasty China, Boksin and the monk Dochim kindled a restoration movement. They sent for the prince Buyeo Pung, who had been living as a hostage in Yamato period Japan, an important Baekje ally. With some Japanese aid, they gathered the remnants of the Baekje army and launched a series of attacks on the Silla-Tang forces.

== Death ==
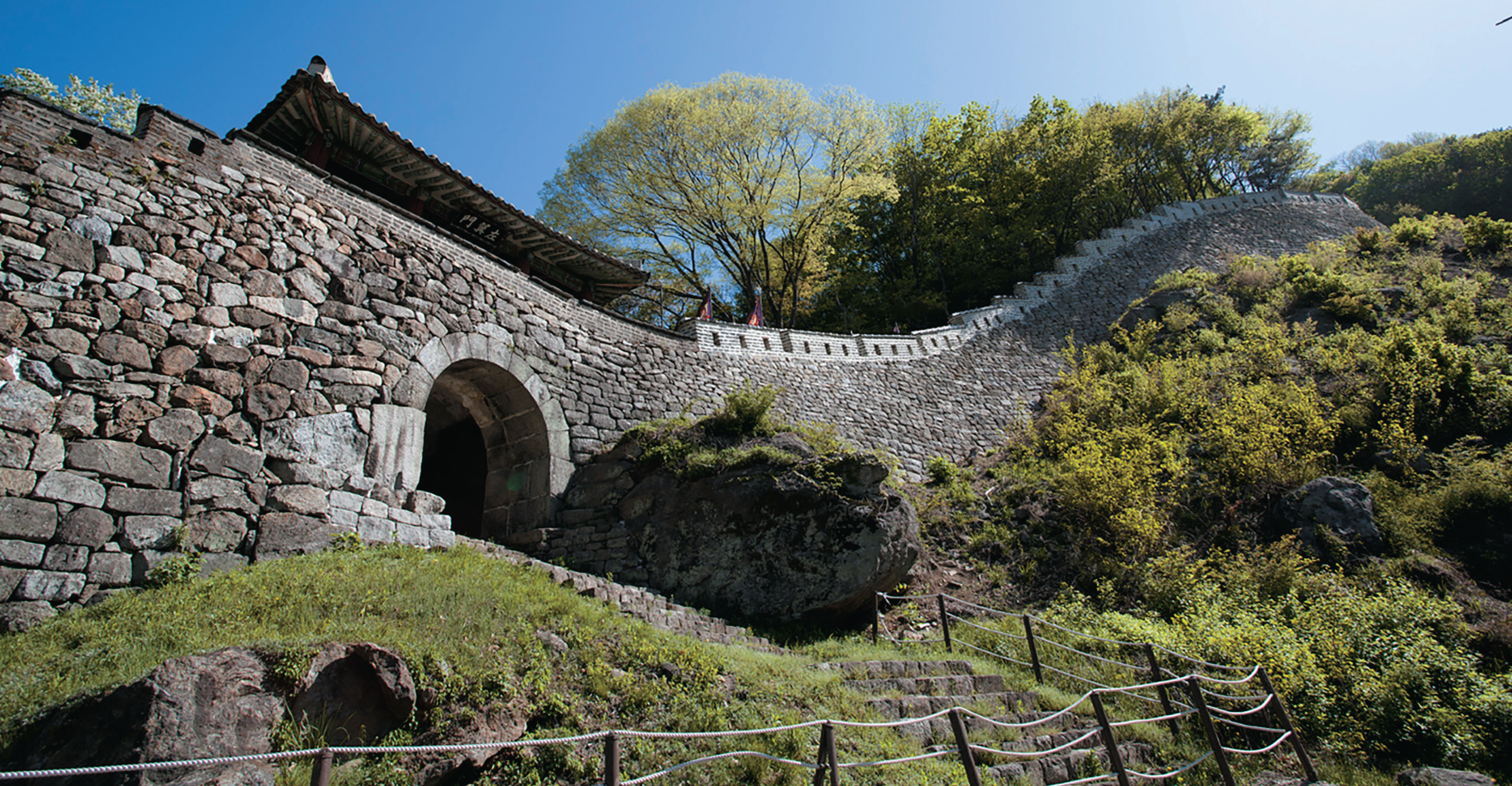
Juryu Fortress today.

In 663, Silla and Tang counterattacked, and besieged the restoration movement at a fortress known as Juryu Castle (주류성/周留城). At this point Boksin appears to have betrayed the restoration movement. He had Dochim killed and sought to slay Prince Pung as well. However, Pung killed him first, and fled to Goguryeo. The restoration movement was destroyed shortly thereafter at the Battle of Baekgang.

Excerpt from Nihon Shoki:

- "Vanguard shogun Kamitsukeno no Kimi Wakako took Silla’s twin castles in Sabikinue. The Baekje King Pungjang suspected Boksin of treachery, and so made holes in the palms of his hands and bound him with a leather cord. Then he asked the myriad ministers, “Boksin’s crime is this. Shall we behead him or no?” Then Tatsusotsu Deok Jipdeuk said, “This evil betrayer cannot be released.” Then Boksin spat on Jipdeuk and said, “You rotten dog.” The king ordered a strong man to behead Boksin and pickle his neck."

The location of Juryu Castle, at which Boksin's life came to an end, is now generally believed to be Ugeumam Mountain Fortress in Buan County, North Jeolla.

Rites to propitiate the spirits of Boksin and Dochim are still held annually at the village of Eunsan-ri in Buyeo County, near the ancient Baekje capital. The ceremony is called Eunsan byeolsinje, and it is a National Intangible Cultural Heritage of South Korea.

== Legacy ==
He had two sons, Gwisil Jipsin (鬼室集信) and Gwisil Jipsa (鬼室集斯) who both settled in Japan. Jipsa is recorded in the Nihon Shoki as coming to Japan in the eight year of Emperor Tenji (676) and became ancestor of several Japanese clans including the Kikuchi clan of Higo Province, Kyushu.

== Popular culture ==
- Portrayed by Kim Young-ki in the 2012-2013 KBS1 TV series Dream of the Emperor.

== See also ==
- Gwisil
- History of Korea
- Baekje
- Dochim
- Uija of Baekje
- Buyeo Pung
- Three Kingdoms of Korea
- List of monarchs of Korea
