= Ungjin =

Previous name of Gongju, South Korea

- Hangul: 웅진
- Hanja: 熊津
- RR: Ungjin
- MR: Ungjin

Ungjin, also known as Gomnaru (Hangul: 곰나루; literally "bear port") or traditionally, Gomanaru/Komanaru (Hangul: 고마나루), is a former city on the Korean Peninsula. It was located in modern-day Gongju, South Chungcheong province, South Korea. It was the capital of Paekche from AD 475 to 538, during a period when Paekche was under threat from Goguryeo, the previous capital of Wiryeseong (modern-day Seoul) having been overrun. In 538, King Seong moved the capital to Sabi (in modern-day Buyeo County). Ungjin is now known as Gongju.

Notable historical places of Ungjin Paekche are Gongsan Fortress and Tomb of King Muryeong.

== History ==
In 475, Paekche had an attack by Gogureyo army led by King Jangsu, and then Wiryeseong, the first capital of Paekche, was destroyed. Paekche's new king, Munju, moved its capital to Ungjin.

During the reign of King Muryeong, kingdom recovered its political stability, and diplomacy ties with Liang dynasty of China and Japan. Paekche brought Chinese culture, and introduced it to Silla, Gaya, and Japan.

Ungjin maintained its position until transfer of the capital in 538 by King Seong. Ungjin period regarded as a time of restored its national power and stability for revival.

== See also ==
- Three Kingdoms of Korea
- History of Korea
- Wiryeseong
- Sabi
- Ungjin Commandery
