= Buyeo Pung =

Prince of Baekje

- Hangul: 부여풍
- Hanja: 扶餘豊
- RR: Buyeo Pung
- MR: Puyŏ P'ung

Buyeo Pung (扶餘豊, 623–668) was a prince of Baekje, one of the Three Kingdoms of Korea. He was son of the last king, Uija of Baekje. When Baekje fell to the Silla–Tang alliance in 660, he was a hostage who mortgaged the alliance of Baekje with Japan. He was shortly unofficially proclaimed king.

He came back with a Japanese army and Yamato general Abe no Hirafu to revive the country. General Boksin of the Baekje revival forces gave him the title King Pungjang (풍장왕; 豊璋王). He joined forces with the Baekje resistance led by general Boksin. In 663, however, the Baekje resistance and Japan lost the Battle of Baekgang to the army of Tang and Silla, and Baekje collapsed. The prince fled to neighboring Goguryeo. When Goguryeo collapsed, he was captured by the Tang army and sent to southern China in exile. His later life is unknown.

One of his brothers, Zenkō (善光 or 禅広), settled in Japan and was given the family name Kudara no Konikishi (百濟王; king of Baekje) by the emperor of Japan.

== Toraijin theory ==
In modern times, Japanese historians claim that Buyeo Pung, also known as "Houshou (豊璋/ほうしょう)" in Japan, was in fact Fujiwara no Kamatari due to much overlap in their stories and accomplishments.

== Popular culture ==
- Portrayed by Jang Tae-sung in the 2012–2013 KBS1 TV series Dream of the Emperor.

== See also ==
- Uija of Baekje
- Buyeo Yung
- Silla–Tang alliance
- History of Korea
- Three Kingdoms of Korea
- List of monarchs of Korea

== Notes ==
King Pungjang House of Buyeo Cadet branch of the House of Go
Regnal titles
Preceded by Uija	King of Baekje; 660–663	Annexed by Tang and Silla
Titles in pretence
Loss of title	— TITULAR — King of Baekje; 663–677; Reason for succession failure: Battle of Baekgang	Succeeded by Buyeo Yung
