= Kudara no Konikishi clan =

Japanese clan of Baekje origin

Kudara no Konikishi clan 百済王
- Parent house: Buyeo
- Titles: Various
- Founder: Zenkō
- Founding year: circa 691
- Cadet branches: Miyake clan; Mimatsu clan

The Kudara no Konikishi clan (Japanese: 百済王氏, Kudara no konikishi-uji) was an immigrant clan from Korea that was active during the Kofun period. The founder, Zenkō (善光 or 禅広), was a son of King Uija, the last king of Paekche.

== Name ==
Kudara was an uji, or clan name, and represented its country of origin, Paekche. Konikishi or Kokishi, which literally means "king", was a special kabane that was given only to the former royal families of Paekche and Goguryeo: the Kudara, Shōna (肖奈) and Koma (高麗) clans.

== History ==
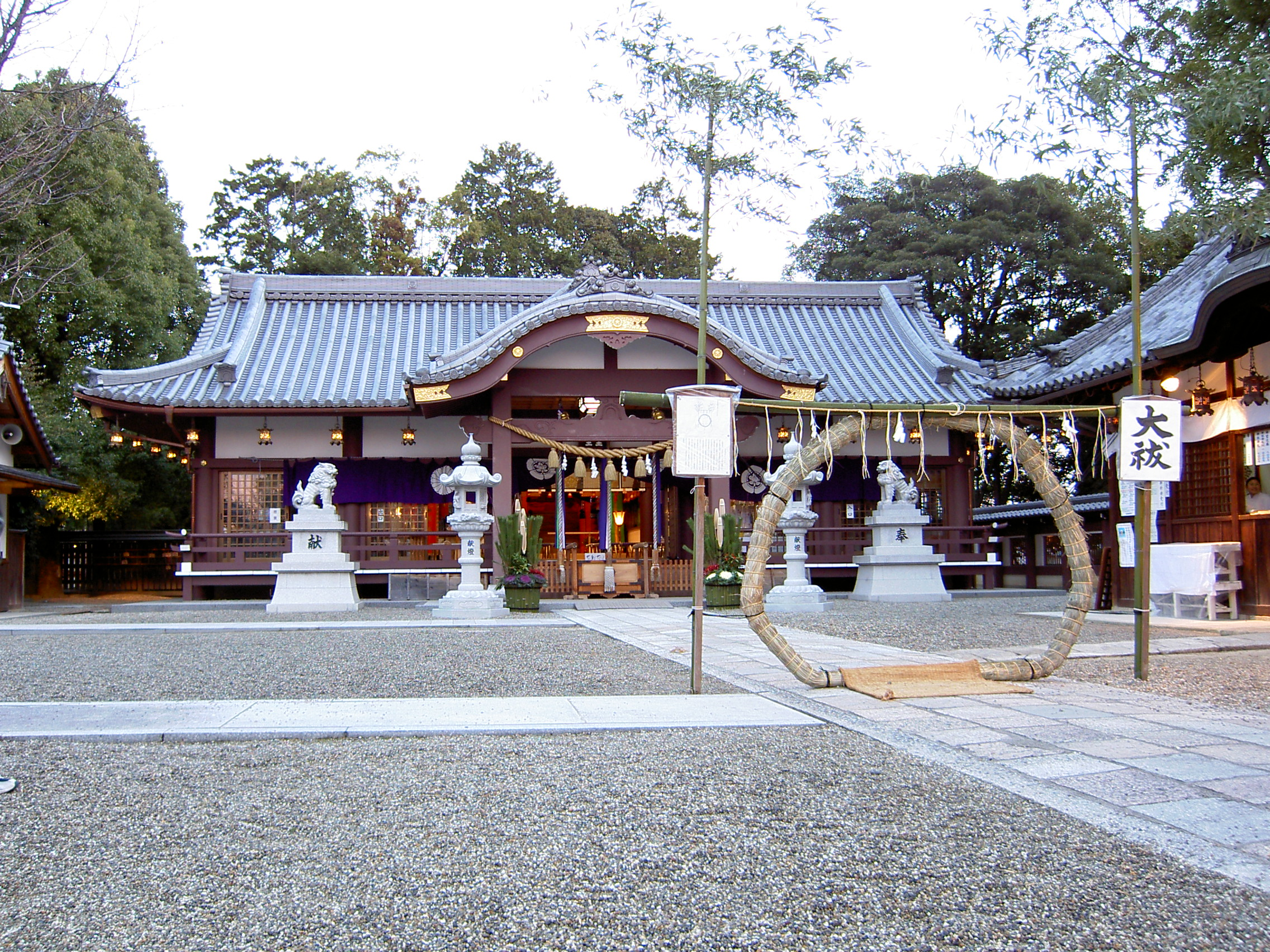
Kudarao Shrine in Hirakata, Osaka Prefecture enshrines the ancestors of the Kudara no Konikishi clan

The founder Zenkō came from Paekche to Japan as a hostage along with his brother Hōshō in 643. Even though Japan sent Hōshō back to Korea for a failed campaign to revive Paekche, Zenkō remained in Japan. The former royal family members were treated as "barbarian guests" (蕃客) and were not incorporated into the domestic political system of Japan for some time. They enjoyed privileged treatment although they were obliged to serve the emperor in a symbolic fashion.

They were finally assimilated into Japanese bureaucracy in 691. They were given the name "Kudara no Konikishi" sometime afterward. The event has drawn scholarly attention, and a couple of theories have been proposed to explain the reason why they were given that peculiar name at that particular time. One theory associates the event with the enforcement of the Asuka Kiyomihara Code in 689, the law that entailed clarification of their legal status. However, while being subjects to the Japanese emperor, they still needed to represent the Paekche kingship by the special name. Japan applied to itself the Chinese ideology of emperorship that required "barbarian people" to long for the great virtue of the emperor. In so doing, Yamato Japan established for itself a system in which it, as a sponsor of the defunct kingdom of Paekche through its royal house, by extension rivalled Baekje's remaining traditional rival on the Korean Peninsula, Silla.

In 790, Emperor Kanmu issued a rescript that treated the Kudara no Konikishi clan as "relatives by marriage." It was related to the fact that the emperor's mother, Takano no Niigasa, belonged to the Paekche-originated Yamato no Fuhito clan, which also claimed its roots in the Paekche royal family. In addition, according to the Shoku Nihongi, Takano no Niigasa was a 10th-generation descendant of King Muryeong of Baekje through his son Prince Junda (Nihon Shoki, chapter 17), making Emperor Kammu an 11th-generation descendant of Muryeong through maternal lineage.

Another theory attempts to interpret the rise and the fall of the Kudara no Konikishi clan in the context of domestic politics, rather than political ideology. The clan fell under the influence of the southern branch of the Fujiwara clan after Kudara no Konikishi Myōshin had married Fujiwara no Tsugutada around 754. The emperor's rescript of 790 aimed to support Myōshin's appointment as lady-in-waiting (尚侍), the highest post among court ladies, despite her humble origin. She helped the clan's other female members enter the imperial court. Their prosperous days ended in 807, when Fujiwara no Takatoshi, the son of Tsugutada and Myōshin, fell from power in an imperial succession dispute. They declined from the latter half of the 9th century to the early 10th century and disappeared from the political scene.

== Notable members ==
- Kudara no Konikishi Zenkō (百済王禅光) (617-700) - The founder of the clan
- Kudara no Konikishi Shōsei (百済王昌成) (?-674) - son of the founder
- Kudara no Konikishi Rōgu (百済王朗虞) (661-737) - Vice Governor of Settsu (摂津亮)
- Kudara no Konikishi Kyōfuku (百済王敬福) (697-766) - Lord of Justice (刑部卿)
- Kudara no Konikishi Shuntetsu (百済王俊哲) (740-795) - General of Peace Guard for Mutsu and Vice Delegate of Conquering East-Barbarian (陸奥鎮守将軍征夷副使)
- Kudara no Konikishi Bukyō (百済王武鏡) - Governor of Dewa (出羽守)

== See also ==
- Toraijin
  - Japanese clans#Immigrant clans
