= Sabi (Korea) =

538–660 capital of Paekche

Coordinates: 36°16′55″N 126°54′45″E

- Hangul: 사비
- Hanja: 泗沘
- RR: Sabi
- MR: Sabi

Sabi (Korean: 사비) was the third and final capital of the Korean kingdom of Paekche, from 538 until Paekche's fall in 660 CE. The site of Sabi is located in modern-day Buyeo County, South Chungcheong Province, in South Korea.

== Location ==
The location of Sabi is north of current downtown Buyeo at the southern foot of Busosan Mountain. This location was chosen for its natural fortifications and ease of access to other regions. It was located on a plain on the Geum River, which served as a point of outreach to the southern portion of the Korean peninsula and the Gaya Region. It was located at the foot of mountains, which helped shield it from attacks, though it was surrounded by extensive agricultural lands. The Yellow Sea was also nearby, which facilitated easier trade with China and Japan.

== History ==
Sabi was the third and final capital of Paekche. The previous capital, Ungjin (웅진), was isolated in the mountains, cutting it off from the outside world, making it an unfit location for the capital. King Song, the king of Paekche, moved the capital approximately 30 kilometers southwest to Sabi in 538 CE. Sabi was the capital of the kingdom of Paekche for 120 years, until 660 CE, when Paekche fell to an attack from the neighboring kingdom of Silla, combined with forces from Tang Dynasty China. The city officially surrendered on August 24, 660.

During the 120 years, Sabi was under the control of:

- King Song (523–554)
- King Widok (554–598)
- King Hye (598–599)
- King Pop (599–600)
- King Mu (600–641)
- King Uija (641–660)

King Mu attempted to move the capital to Iksan (익산) during his reign, but the attempt was not successful.

Sabi Conferences were held in 541 and 544. See also Anra Conference held in 529.

In 541, the first Sabi Conference was held, and envoys from Paekche, Anra, Daegaya, Zolma, Sanbanhae, Dara, Sagi, Jata, and Anra-wa gathered. At this meeting, Gaya asked Paekche if they could defend against Silla's attacks. Then, Paekche said Takgitan, Taksun, and Geumgwan Gaya were all ruined by weakness own and promised to defend themselves. In fact, Paekche could not make a strong promise because Paekche needed Silla's help to regain the Han River basin. In July, Anra felt uneasy and contacted Silla through the Anra-wa envoy. After noticing this, Paekche (King Seong) contacted Imna and objected. In July 542, Beakje declared a Gaya Confederacy revival, but it was not accomplished. Anra engaged in diplomacy instead.

In November 543, the Emperor Kinmei of Japan declared that it would send out Paekche's generals within the Imna and Gaya Confederacy. In December 543, King Seong held a Jeongsa Rock Council to resolve Gaya's rebellion, and the conclusion was to hold a second Sabi Conference.

Paekche attempted to reconvene a Conference in December 543, but the Gaya Confederacy continued to make excuses. Japan announced that it was willing to participate in the Sabi conference, but the Gaya Confederacy did not attend. Eventually, in October 544, the envoy of Paekche returned from Japan and promised to grant Gaya the request as much as possible.

In 544 November, the second Sabi Conference was held, and eight countries, including Paekche and the Gucha, gathered. In order to protect the Gaya Confederacy, King Seong of Paekche said at the meeting, "We will build six castles on the Nakdong River, the border area between Silla and Anra, and instead of stationed 3,000 Japanese soldiers and Paekche troops, Paekche will pay for it." He called for all the Gaya Japanese in the Anra-wa envoy office to be sent to Japan. The Gaya Confederacy disbanded after saying it would think deeply about the proposal.

In March and May of 545, Japan and Paekche exchanged envoys. They exchanged envoys again in January, June and July 546. In April 547 Paekche requested Silla, Gaya, and Japan to supply soldiers.

In January 548, the Goguryeo-Ye Alliance attacked, but Silla sent 3,000 soldiers and eventually managed to stop them, in the Battle of Mt. Doksseong Castle (독성산성전투; 禿城山城戰鬪) in 548.

After Paekche fought with Goguryeo, King Seong led the armies of Silla and Imna as well as the Paekche army, starting the Han River Restoration War (한강 수복전; 漢江收復戰) 551–553. Through this, Paekche recovered the Han River but was betrayed by Silla in Battle of Gwansan Castle (관산성전투; 管山城 戰鬪) in 554. The Fall of the Gaya confederacy occurred in 562 as Silla conquered the entire territory.

== Features ==
The city was surrounded by a two-layered defense. The outer layer was the Busosan Fortress, which guarded the capital from the side that the nearby mountains left open. The inner layer was The Naseong (나성) City Wall which encircled the entire capital. The original appearance of both layers are still intact.

The city was divided into five administrative districts called bu (부), which were divided into five smaller districts called hang (항).

The royal palace and its surrounding facilities were located directly at the southern foot of Busosan Mountain. There was a manmade pond located south of the palace. It was completed in 634, under the orders of King Mu.

Excavation since the 1980s has uncovered the building site of the royal palace, including water supply facilities, storage facilities, and a lotus pond. The site of the Jeongnimsa (정림사) Temple, which was built in the center of the city, was also discovered, as well as royal tombs just outside the eastern part of the Naseong City Wall. These archeological sites were added to UNESCO World Heritage List in 2015.

=== Royal palace ===
The royal palace and its surrounding facilities are located at the northernmost end of the city. There, a large building site was discovered. The site spans 35m across and 18.5m in length, which is evident from the 50 cm tall remains of the platform that once supported the building. Within the site, 36 rammed-earth foundations were discovered, which are believed to have supported the pillars and cornerstones of the building.

The site was confirmed to be the royal palace due to three different types of evidence. The first was a gilt-bronze waist belt was found at the site. The belt could have only belonged to a king due to the strict hierarchy of Paekche society at the time. This discovery indicated that the area was once the residence of a king. Roof tiles with inscriptions of the royal court, large stone structures, and a monument to Liu Renyuan of Tang China, were found at the site. These point to the importance of the location, which indicate it being the royal palace. The site was also used for local government offices in later Korean dynasties.

Two large wooden water tanks, five underground wooden storage facilities, three stone storage facilities, and various other storage pits were also found at the location. A man-made lotus pond that was 10.6m in width, 6.2m in length, and from 1 to 1.2m in depth, was found too.

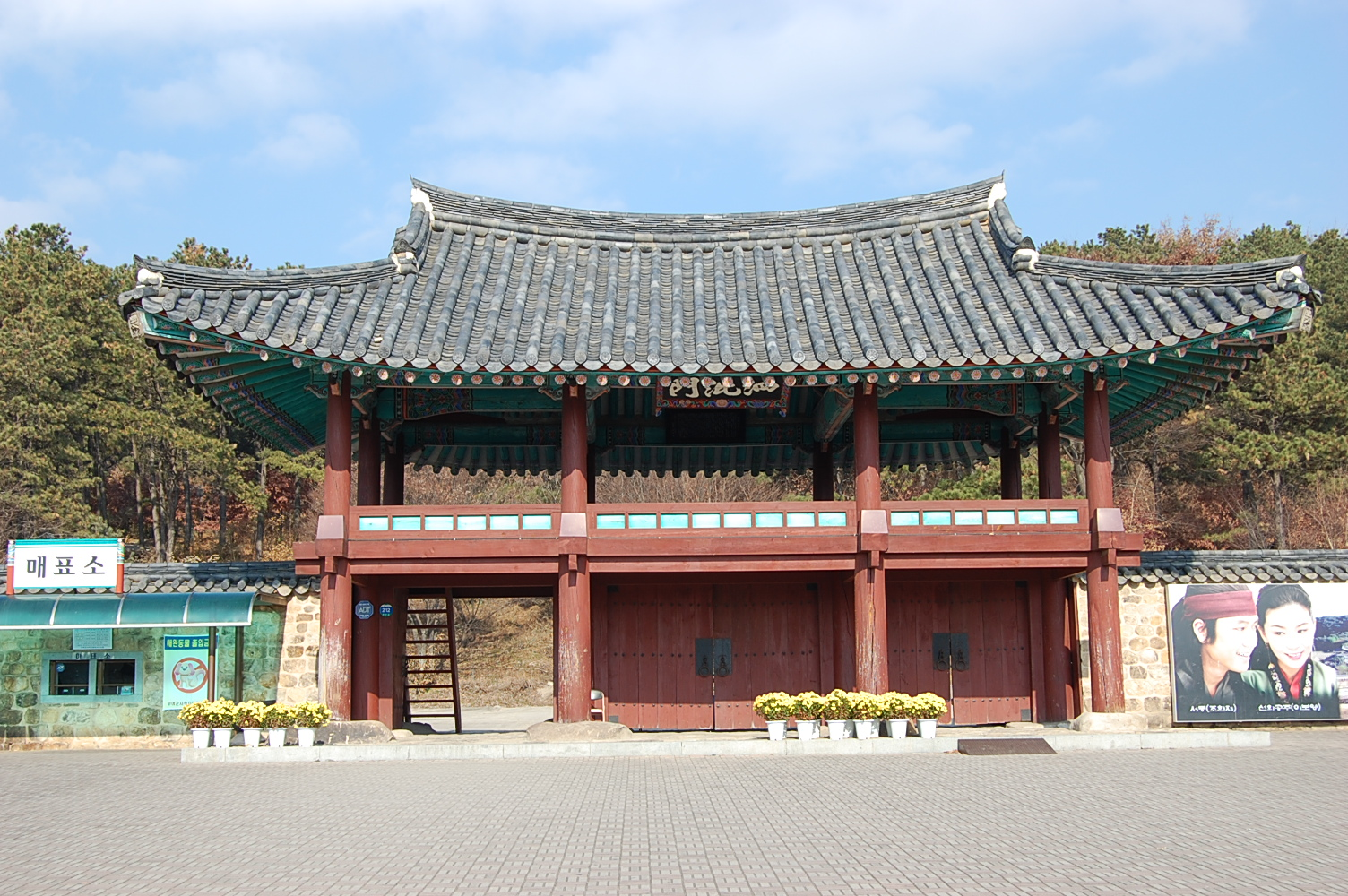
Gate of Busosan Fortress

=== Busosanseong, or Sabi Fortress ===
Sabi Fortress is also known by the names Busosanseong, Sabiseong or Soburiseong Fortress. It consists of the inner fortress divided by roads centered on the royal palace, a defensive fortress called "Buso Mountain Fortress", and outer walls surrounding the palace. The inner part of the fortress consists of five district areas, where the existence of each district was verified through rocks, roof titles, and wooden tablets etched with the name of administrative areas. It is also assumed that the royal palace of Paekche had been located on this site.

The fortress was built to protect the city from the sides that weren't naturally protected by the surrounding mountains and river. It was built using a rammed-earth technique and had a perimeter of 2,495m, was 5 to 6m wide at the base, and was 3m high. Building sites, including a barracks for Paekche soldiers, as well as Gate Sites, have been found within the fortress. Two Gate Sites have been identified, the first, which was the main gate, was on the south side of the fortress, while the second one was on the east side.

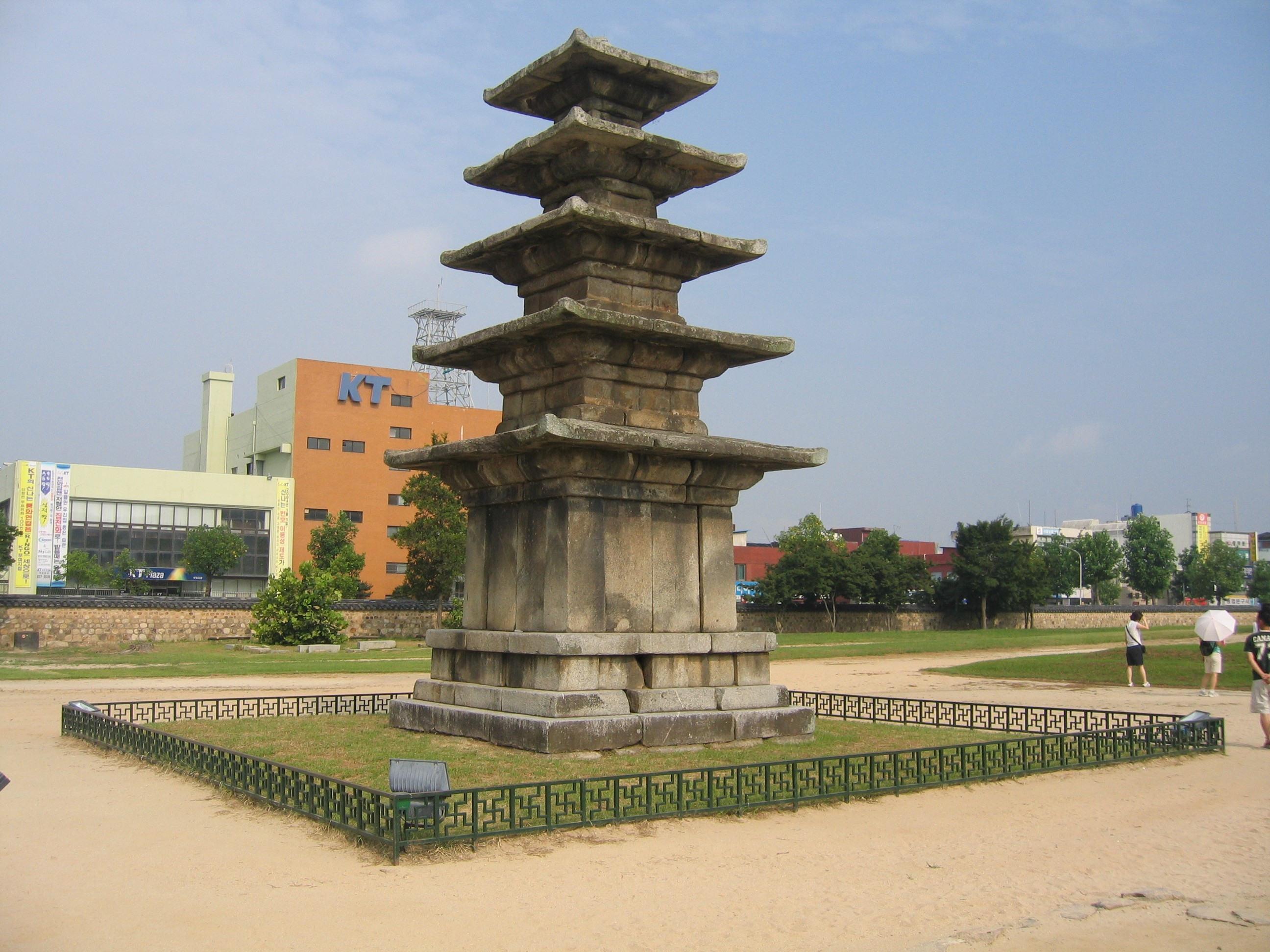
Jeongnimsa Stone Pagoda

=== Jeongnimsa ===
The temple Jeongnimsa was located at the center of Sabi and is still located at the center of modern-day Buyeo. The temple included a central gate, a prayer hall, a lecture hall, and monks' dormitories that were connected to the main buildings by linking corridors. The layout is believed to either have been "one pagoda and one prayer hall" or "one pagoda and two prayer halls."

The only thing still remaining of the temple is an 8.3m tall stone pagoda. The pagoda has Chinese characters carved into the surface of it. The writing is celebrating the Tang Dynasty's victory over the Kingdom of Paekche and was put there by the commanding Tang general, Liu Renyuan.

=== Royal tombs ===
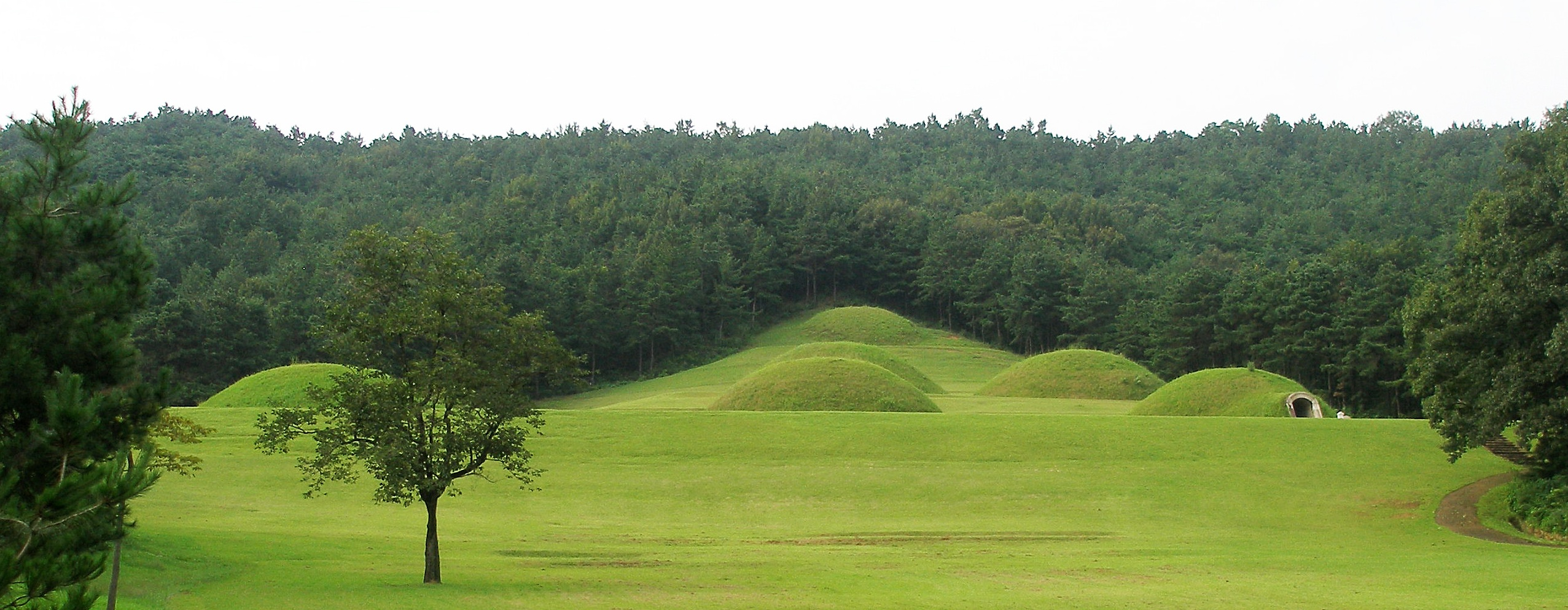
Neungsanri Royal Tombs

Outside the eastern part of the city wall, seven tombs are located. The tombs are within mounds of hollowed earth and can be seen as semi-spheres on the hillside. They are arranged in two rows of three mounds, while one mound is located 50m to the north.

The tombs are classified as stone chambers with a corridor, and are divided into types based on what type of ceiling they have. The royal tombs of Sabi have three different types: vault ceiling, hexagonal flat ceiling, and square flat ceiling.

== See also ==
- History of Korea
- Three Kingdoms of Korea
- Wiryeseong
- Ungjin
- Baekje Cultural Land
