= Yu Zhining =

Chinese Tang dynasty official (588–666)

Yu Zhining (Chinese: 于志寧; 588 – 3 January 666), courtesy name Zhongmi (仲謐), posthumous name Duke Ding of Yan (燕定公), was a Chinese politician of the Tang dynasty, during the reigns of Emperor Taizong and Emperor Gaozong. He had served on the staff of Emperor Taizong's oldest son and crown prince Li Chengqian and, after Li Chengqian was removed for plotting to overthrow Emperor Taizong in 643, received approval for having tried to correct Li Chengqian in his ways. Emperor Taizong promoted him, and he subsequently played prominent roles in the imperial government late in Emperor Taizong's reign and early in Emperor Gaozong's reign. In 659, however, because he had previously not supported the ascension of Emperor Gaozong's second wife Empress Wu, he was removed from his office based on accusations by her ally Xu Jingzong that he had conspired with Emperor Gaozong's uncle Zhangsun Wuji, who had opposed Empress Wu's ascension.

== Background ==
Yu Zhining was born in 588, during the reign of Emperor Wen of Sui. He was from Sui's capital province Yong Province (雍州, roughly modern Xi'an, Shaanxi), and his ancestors, ethnically Xianbei, were of a prominent line of generals during Sui's predecessor dynasty Northern Zhou. His great-grandfather Yu Jin, in particular, was a renowned general during the latter years of Northern Zhou's predecessor Western Wei and Northern Zhou. His father Yu Xuandao (于宣道) was a mid-level official in the legislative bureau of government, the Neishi Sheng (內史省).

Late in the reign of Emperor Wen's son and successor Emperor Yang, Yu Zhining served as the county magistrate for Guanshi County (冠氏, in modern Liaocheng, Shandong). As at the time, most of Sui realm was engulfed by agrarian rebellions, he left his post without leave and fled home, to Yong Province. In 617, the general Li Yuan rebelled at Taiyuan and proceeded towarded the capital Chang'an (i.e., Yong Province), with Emperor Yang away at Jiangdu (江都, in modern Yangzhou, Jiangsu), capturing Chang'an in winter 617 and declaring Emperor Yang's grandson Yang You the Prince of Dai emperor (as Emperor Gong). Yu led a group of men to welcome him at one of Emperor Yang's secondary palaces, Changchun Palace (長春宮). As Li Yuan had heard of Yu's reputation of being capable earlier, he bestowed the honorific title of Yinqing Guanglu Daifu (銀青光祿大夫) on Yu. Meanwhile, as Li Yuan's son and major general Li Shimin was then pacifying the cities north of the Wei River, he made Yu a member of his staff.

In 618, after news arrived at Chang'an that Emperor Yang had been killed in a coup led by the general Yuwen Huaji, Li Yuan had Yang You yield the throne to him, establishing the Tang dynasty as its Emperor Gaozu. Li Shimin was created the Prince of Qin, and became his father's most reliable general in fighting the various contenders for supremacy. Yu continued to serve on Li Shimin's staff and often accompanied him on campaigns. When Emperor Gaozu allowed Li Shimin to retain a staff of literary men, Yu was named to that staff as well.

== During Emperor Taizong's reign ==
In 626, Li Shimin, locked in an intense rivalry with his brother Li Jiancheng the Crown Prince, ambushed Li Jiancheng and another brother who supported Li Jiancheng, Li Yuanji the Prince of Qi, at Xuanwu Gate and killed them both. He then effectively forced Emperor Gaozu to first create him crown prince and then yield the throne to him, and he took the throne as Emperor Taizong. It appeared that he did not initially promote Yu Zhining, but in 629, Yu was promoted to the post of deputy head of the legislative bureau of government. On one occasion, when Emperor Taizong invited the high level officials to a feast, he was surprised not to see Yu—and when he asked, the answer he received was that Yu, who was observant of protocol, decided not to attend because the orders actually only stated that officials of the third rank or above were invited, and his post was not of the third rank, but of the fourth rank, first class. Emperor Taizong thereafter specifically issued an invitation addressed to Yu, and also soon bestowed on him the honorific post of Sanqi Changshi (散騎常侍) —which was the third rank, second class—while also making him one of the key staff members for his oldest son Li Chengqian the Crown Prince and creating him the Duke of Liyang.

After Emperor Gaozu's death in 635, Emperor Taizong began building the imperial temples to worship his ancestors (including his father). The chancellor Fang Xuanling suggested that Emperor Gaozu's seventh-generation ancestor, Li Gao (the founder of the Sixteen Kingdoms period state Western Liang) be honored as the main Tang ancestor, but Yu opposed, arguing that Tang's imperial powers did not originate from Li Gao, and therefore Li Gao should not be honored as the main ancestor. Emperor Taizong agreed.

In 639, when Emperor Taizong instituted a feudal scheme where key contributors to Tang rule were given prefectural prefect posts, to be passed to their descendants, Yu was among its key opponents. Eventually, particularly due to fervent opposition by Emperor Taizong's brother-in-law Zhangsun Wuji, the feudal scheme was cancelled.

During the years that Yu served on Li Chengqian's staff, he often made suggestions to Li Chengqian to try to improve Li Chengqian's behavior, and when Emperor Taizong heard about this, he awarded Yu with gold and silk. In 640, he promoted Yu to the post of Li Chengqian's head of household. In 641, when Yu's mother died, Yu resigned to observe a mourning period for her but was soon recalled to the post. When he requested that he be allowed to observe the three-year mourning period, Emperor Taizong sent the official Cen Wenben to persuade him otherwise, stating: "In this case, your faithfulness and filial piety may conflict. My son needs your guidance, and I am asking you to hold back your emotions." Yu therefore returned to his post.

For the next few years, Yu continued to try to correct Li Chengqian's behavior, and several of the submissions he made to Li Chengqian are extant, including his counsel against building palaces during the summer heat, Li Chengqian's liking for music, and his closeness to eunuchs. On one occasion, when Yu wrote a particularly blunt submission on two matters—Li Chengqian's refusal to allow his staff members to go on vacation, and his reception of the ethnically Tujue man Dageyou (達哥友) into his palace—Li Chengqian became so incensed that he sent the assassins Zhang Sizheng (張思政) and Gegan Chengji (紇干承基) to assassinate Yu. When Zhang and Gegan went to Yu's house to kill him, however, they saw that Yu was living frugally and continuing to mourn his mother, and they could not bring themselves to kill him.

In 643, Li Chengqian was discovered to have conspired with his uncle Li Yuanchang (李元昌) the Prince of Han, his brothers-in-law Zhao Jie (趙節) and Du He (杜荷), and the general Hou Junji, to overthrow Emperor Taizong (over his fears that Emperor Taizong would replace him with his favored brother Li Tai the Prince of Wei). Emperor Taizong deposed Li Chengqian and replaced him with a younger son, Li Zhi the Prince of Jin. Most of Li Chengqian's staff were blamed for not correcting his behavior and were demoted or exiled, but Yu was praised for having tried to correct Li Chengqian. Emperor Taizong subsequently made him a member of Li Zhi's staff.

== During Emperor Gaozong's reign ==
In 649, Emperor Taizong died while at the summer palace Cuiwei Palace (翠微宮), after entrusting Li Zhi to Zhangsun Wuji and Chu Suiliang. Under Zhangsun's suggestion, Emperor Taizong's death was kept secret, as Li Zhi escorted Emperor Taizong's casket back to Chang'an. Once that happened, three key members of Li Zhi's staff—Yu Zhining, Zhang Xingcheng, and Gao Jifu—were promoted to chancellor posts, before Emperor Taizong's death was announced. Li Zhi took the throne as Emperor Gaozong. (In Yu's case, he was promoted to be Shizhong (侍中), the head of the examination bureau of government, a post considered one for a chancellor.)

In 650, Emperor Gaozong bestowed the honorific title of Guanglu Daifu (光祿大夫) on Yu, and also created him the greater title of Duke of Yan—a title that his great-grandfather Yu Jin once held.

In 651, Yu was made in charge of editing imperial historical records. He was also made Puye (僕射), the head of the executive bureau, and continued to serve as chancellor. In 652, when Emperor Gaozong created his oldest son Li Zhong crown prince, Yu was made titularly an advisor of the young crown prince as well. There was an occasion when Emperor Gaozong awarded estates to him, Zhang, and Gao. Yu declined, pointing out that neither Zhang nor Gao was from the region near the capital and therefore needed estates, but he himself was from the capital region and therefore already had property in the region, offering to have his share be given to Zhang and Gao instead. Emperor Taizong was impressed and accepted his suggestion.

In 655, when Emperor Gaozong, whose favors for his wife Empress Wang had waned, believed in the accusations of his favorite concubine Consort Wu (later known as Wu Zetian) that Empress Wang and her mother Lady Liu had used witchcraft and that Empress Wang had killed Consort Wu's daughter, wanted to depose Empress Wang and replace her with Consort Wu. The chancellors Chu, Han Yuan, and Lai Ji all strenuously objected. Zhangsun also showed disapproval by his silent refusal to endorse the acts. Yu was described to be neutral on the matter, while Li Ji stated that it was Emperor Gaozong's own household business. Emperor Gaozong thus became resolved, and he deposed Empress Wang and replaced her with Consort Wu. (Empress Wang was subsequently killed on the new Empress Wu's orders.) In 659, Yu requested to retire from his post, and he was made a senior advisor to the new crown prince—Empress Wu's oldest son Li Hong, but continued to carry the designation of a chancellor de facto.

By then, however, Empress Wu's grip on power was firm, and she was taking vengeance on people she believed opposed her ascension, having her ally Xu Jingzong accuse them of having plotted treason. Zhangsun was exiled and then forced to commit suicide. Empress Wang's uncle Liu Shi was executed. Their households, as well as that of Han Yuan (who would have suffered execution as well but for the fact that he had already died by the time that executioners arrived at his place of exile), were confiscated to become servants. Empress Wu was not satisfied, and she had Xu accuse Yu of having been part of Zhangsun's faction. Yu was thus removed from his post and demoted to be the prefect of Rong Prefecture (榮州, roughly modern Zigong, Sichuan), and eight other members of his were demoted as well.

In 664, Yu was made the prefect of Hua Prefecture (華州, roughly modern Weinan, Shaanxi), close to the capital, a sign that he had regained some imperial favor, and later that year, he requested retirement, which was granted. In January 666, he died at his mansion. In 676, his prior honors were all posthumously restored.

It was said that Yu liked welcoming guests, and many young officials gathered around him. However, he was criticized for not being able to find the most capable among them and recommend them.

== Notes and references ==
- Old Book of Tang, vol. 78.
- New Book of Tang, vol. 104.
- Zizhi Tongjian, vols. 194, 195, 196, 197, 199, 200.
