= Gaozong campaign of Tibet =

Battle in Tibet

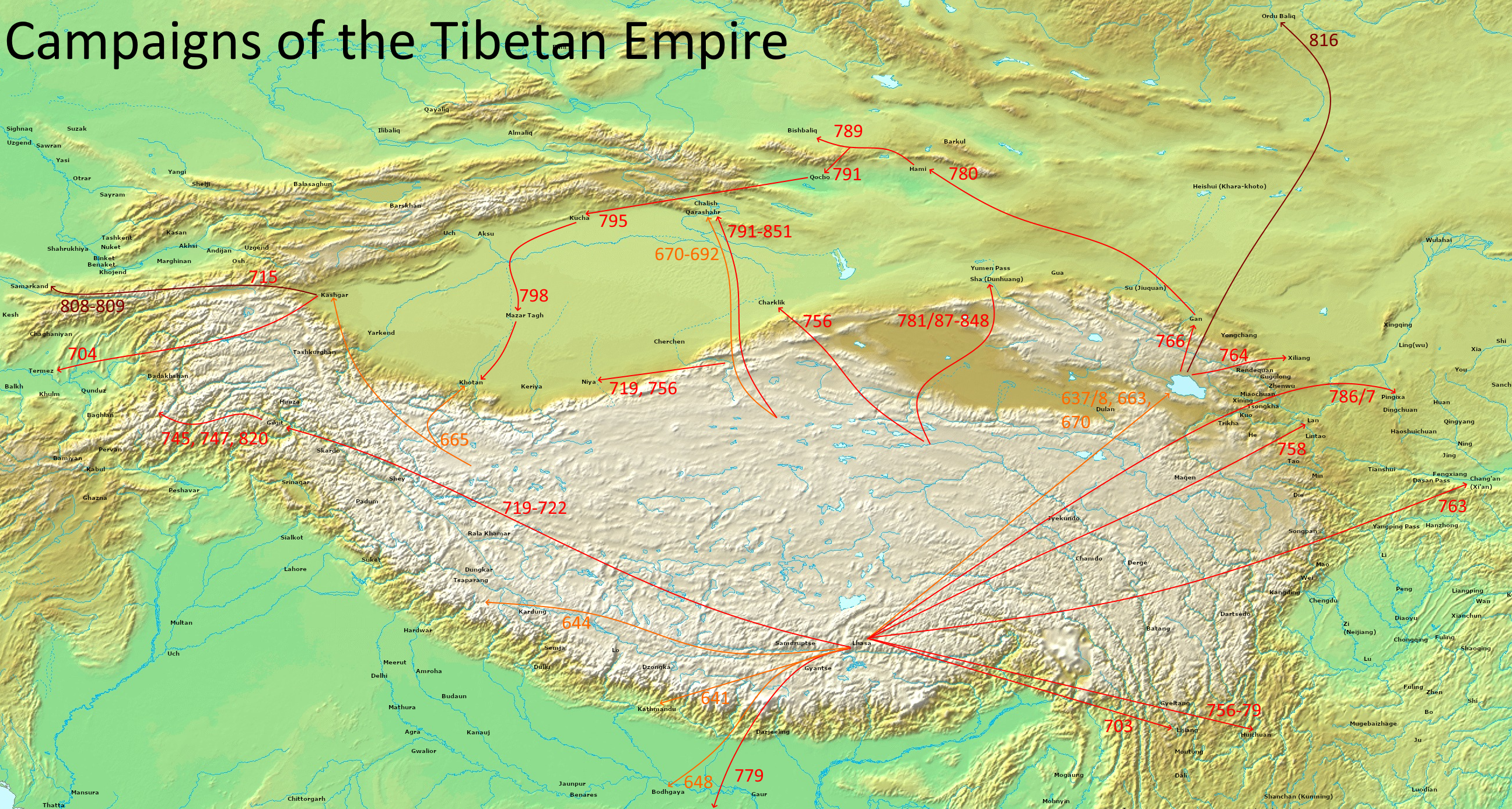
Date	Late 678-679 AD
Location	Modern day China
Result	Inconclusive: Recapture of the Western Garrisons by the Tang; Tibetan Empire retains Qocho

Belligerents
Tang dynasty	Tibetan Empire

Commanders and leaders
Emperor Gaozong of Tang; Pei Xingjian; Zhongshu Ling; Li Jingxuan; Liu Jingxian; Heukchi Sangji; Huangfu Wenliang; Gong-bu shang-shu Liu Shenli †/ (POW)	Tridu Songtsen; Gar Trinring Tsendro; Zao-po; Su-he-gui

Emperor Gaozong's campaign of Tibet was a series of campaigns conducted by Tang China from 670-679. This was done as an effort to reverse and neutralize the Tibetan advances upon Tang lands. Chinese forces initially suffered many reverses, but were able to recapture the four western garrisons from Tibet due to the Tibetan king's death. A temporary peace was concluded, and the Chinese hold upon the Heyuan region was secure, but they were unable to secure the whole western frontier. As a result, Tibet retained the areas around the south of Qocho.

== Background ==
The Tibetans annexed the former territory of the Tuyuhun, conquered Qiuci, sacked Shule and attacked Gumo. The Tang force to the Western Regions retook Shule in the middle of 673 and reverted the Kingdom of Khotan and Qiuci to Tang suzerainty.

== Battle ==
In 678 AD, Emperor Gaozong of Tang initiated another anti-Tibetan campaign, but Tang troops led by Zhongshu-ling Li Jingxuan and Gongbu Shangshu Liu Shenli lost to the Tibetans in Qinghai, where Liu Shenli died. Only Zuo Lingjun Yuanwai Jiangjun Heichi Changzhi was successful in the campaign, having conducted a night assault on the Tibetans' camp while the Tibetans were taking over Qiangic territories and destroying Tang garrisons in the west. The Tibetans established connections with the northern Turks and Liu Qixian and Huangfu Wenliang, powerful figures in the court, called for a withdrawal from the battlefield. Subsequently, Heichi Changzhi won a battle against Zao Po and Su He Gui, Tibetan commanders, at Liangfeichuan and was promoted to Heyuan Shi to build up the defense of the border.

In 679 AD, after the death of the Tibetan king, the boy king Qinu Xinong sought peace. The Tang court sent a representative, Langjiang Song Lingwen, to perform the ritual funerary duties. The actual power in the Tibetan court belonged to Qinling, the second son of Ludongzan, who was still in place. In that same year Tang general Pei Xingjian was overseeing the return of a Persian prince and recaptured the four western garrisons controlled by the Tibetans.
