= Pei Xingjian =

Tang Dynasty general and politician

Pei Xingjian (Chinese: 裴行儉) (619 – 9 June 682), courtesy name Shouyue (Chinese: 守約) was a Tang dynasty general and politician. He was best known for his victory over the Khan of Western Turkic Khaganate Ashina Duzhi in 679 CE. He was also responsible for escorting the Sasanian Persian king-in-exile Narsieh to Persia which was occupied by Arab conquerors. He dedicated most of his life to dealing with Turkic tribes in the Anxi Protectorate.

== Life ==
Pei was a nobleman from Hedong Commandery. His prestigious clan Pei clan of Hedong had contributed numerous politicians to the court in the previous dynasties. Xingjian came from one of the 3 cadet branches of Pei Clan, the Middle house (the other two branches were the Western house and the Eastern house).

Xingjian, his brother Xingyan, and his father Renji all served in the military. During the reign of Emperor Taizong of Tang, Xingjian passed the imperial exam. General Su Dingfang saw potentials in Xingjian and personally mentored him.

In 665, Pei was appointed the general of Anxi Protectorate. After serving in Anxi for several years, he returned to the imperial court where he collaborated with Li Jingxuan and Ma Zai.

In 677, Western Turkic Khan Ashina Duzhi invaded Anxi with a strong force. At this point of time, Pei asked for the mission of escorting the Persian throne successor Narsieh to his homeland. His strategy was to tackle the affairs of Persia and Turks at the same time. Tang Emperor Gaozong not only granted his wish but also gave him the mission of pacifying the turbulences in Central Asia.

During his expedition to the West, he successfully defeated the Turkic forces led by Ashina. However, Pei lost his interests in reinstalling the Persian King and left Narsieh in the Anxi Protectorate alone (Although Narsieh was still able to maintain his many servants and a high quality of life). Minor Turkic chieftains in the region then pledged their loyalty to the Chinese dynasty due to the defeat of Ashina. The overall result of Pei's expedition was a success for the Tang empire. Upon returning to China, Pei was appointed the minister of rituals and Great general of the right flank guards.

In 679, Turkic chieftain Ashide Wenfu rebelled. Protectorate general Xiao Siye, a noble from Lanling Commandery, was defeated by Ashide. Pei then took over the command from Xiao and decisively won a battle against the Turks in an ambush. Ashide fled. Not long after the first defeat, he gathered his troops and united them with the troops of another chieftain Ashina Funian. Pei saw the distrust and suspicions between the two chieftains and exploited this weakness by driving a wedge between them. Eventually, Ashina Funian murdered Ashide Wenfu out of the fear of Tang's revenge against him. When Funian was brought to the Tang court, he was executed regardless of the fact that he surrendered his troops. Pei had promised Ashina that he would not be put to death, however, the court did not respect Pei's promise. Due to this incident, Pei retired himself and felt deep regret. Ashina's death, according to New Book of Tang, was a ruse against Xingjian by his very own clansman Pei Yan who was jealous about his victories in the West.

In 682, Pei was again in charge of pacifying yet another Turkic rebellion against the Chinese empire. However, he died of old age in June before the troops were sent out. The imperial court rewarded him the posthumous name Xian (獻) which means "Dedication", as well as the supreme military honorary title Taiwei (太尉).

== Family ==
According to his epitaph written by Zhang Yue, Pei had 2 spouses. His first wife was a Xianbei noble from Luoyang. He married his second wife after the first died. His second wife was of Turkic ethnicity.

Pei had 5 sons:

- Pei Zhenyin, half Xianbei and the eldest son, died before his father leaving a son, Pei Canyuan.
- Pei Chixuan, one of his younger sons. Had a son named Pei Guangdi.
- Pei Yanxiu, one of his younger sons.
- Pei Qingyuan, one of his younger sons.
- Pei Guangting, half Turk. Xingjian's youngest son. Later became Chancellor of Tang.
