= Hao Chujun =

Chinese general and official

Hao Chujun (Chinese: 郝處俊; 607–681), formally Duke of Zengshan (甑山公), was an official and general of the Chinese Tang dynasty, serving as chancellor during the reign of Emperor Gaozong. He was known for his honesty and willingness to advise Emperor Gaozong against actions he considered unwise. One advice he gave, however (against Emperor Gaozong's plan to let his powerful and influential wife Empress Wu, who had ruled China through him until then, to allow serving as regent due to Emperor Gaozong's illness), drew Empress Wu's resentment, and in response to his opposition, Empress Wu reduced the powers of the chancellors in government matters by appointing several scholars as her advisers. She also tried to destroy Hao but failed, forcing only Hao to retire. After she became regent over her son Emperor Ruizong after Emperor Gaozong and Hao had both died, she had Hao's clan slaughtered.

== Background ==
Hao Chujun was born in 607, during the reign of Emperor Yang of Sui. His family was from what would eventually become An Prefecture (安州, roughly modern Xiaogan, Hubei). Late in Emperor Yang's reign, the Sui state was engulfed in agrarian rebellions, and Hao Chujun's father Hao Xianggui (郝相貴) and maternal grandfather Xu Shao (許紹), who was a Sui official, seized and controlled a significant amount of territory in modern Hubei and Chongqing. After they submitted to the Tang dynasty's founding emperor Emperor Gaozu, Hao Xianggui was made Duke of Zengshan and prefect of Chu Prefecture (滁州, roughly modern Chuzhou, Anhui).

When Hao Chujun was a teenager, Hao Xianggui died while still serving as prefect of Chu Prefecture. Hao Xianggui's subordinates, pitying Hao Chujun, gathered silk and wanted to give the silk to him for his upkeep, but he declined it, an act praised by chroniclers at the time. Hao Chujun was said to be studious in his youth; he particularly favored studying the Book of Han (the official history of the Western Han dynasty) and was said to be able to recite it from memory.

== During Emperor Taizong's reign ==
Hao Chujun passed the imperial examination during the reign of Emperor Gaozu's son and successor Emperor Taizong and impressed the chancellor Gao Shilian in doing so. He thereafter served in the imperial administration as a scribe, and he inherited his father's title as Duke of Zengshan. He was known for having good relationships with his brothers and being respectful to his maternal uncles (one of whom, Xu Yushi, would eventually be a chancellor as well). Later, he was made a member of the staff of the Prince of Teng, but Hao found it dishonoring to serve as on a prince's staff, and therefore resigned. A long time thereafter, he was recalled to serve on the crown prince's staff. He was eventually promoted to the post of deputy minister of civil service.

== During Emperor Gaozong's reign ==
Emperor Taizong died in 649 and was succeeded by his son and crown prince Li Zhi (as Emperor Gaozong). He became an assistant chancellors and over time gained higher status. By 664, Empress Wu's influence on the governance of the country had angered Emperor Gaozong so much that he had Chancellor Shangguan Yi draft an edict for her deposition. Empress Wu pleaded with Emperor Gaozong, who relented and In this purge, Hao Chujun was also somewhat reduced. Shangguan was subsequently executed and, from then on, Empress Wu would sit behind a curtain beside Emperor Gaozong and give him advice during imperial meetings and most of the key decisions until the end of his reign were made by Empress Wu.

Around the new year 667, Emperor Gaozong commissioned the chancellor Li Ji to command a major attack on Goguryeo, and Hao Chujun was made an assistant to Li Ji, a campaign during which Hao served with distinction. In one particular incident, Hao, who was said to be obese, was approaching a Goguryeo city when Goguryeo forces launched a surprise counterattack, causing much alarm for Hao's soldiers. Hao, who was said to be obese, did not panic, and instead pulled out a chair and sat down to eat his rations, while secretly ordering his elite troops to attack Goguryeo forces, defeating them. His calmness impressed his troops.

As of 668, Hao was Dong Tai Shilang (東臺侍郎) — deputy head of the examination bureau of government (東臺, Dong Tai) — when Emperor Gaozong became convinced that a Hindu monk, Lujia Yiduo (盧迦逸多), was capable of creating medicine that would bestow immortality. He therefore commissioned Lujia as a general and was poised to take the medicine that Lujia created. Hao spoke against it, pointing out that immortality is impossible and that taking such medicine could have caused Emperor Taizong's death previously. Emperor Gaozong took his advice and did not do so. In 669, he gave Hao the designation Tong Dong Xi Tai Sanpin (同東西臺三品), making Hao a chancellor de facto. Around new year 671, when Emperor Gaozong changed the officials' titles to the ones that were used before 662, Hao's title was changed to Huangmen Shilang (黃門侍郎). At times, when Emperor Gaozong was at the eastern capital Luoyang, he would put the crown prince Li Hong in charge of the capital Chang'an, and generally, all of the chancellors remained at Chang'an to assist Li Hong, except that Hao attended to Emperor Gaozong. In 672, Hao was given the honorific title Yinqing Guanglu Daifu (銀青光祿大夫) and made Zhongshu Shilang (中書侍郎), the deputy head of the legislative bureau of government. In 673, he was put in charge of revising the imperial records, as it was suspected that the previous lead editor, Xu Jingzong, had made many inaccurate records.

In 674, during an imperial feast, for entertainment, Emperor Gaozong divided the imperial musicians into two teams and ordered that his sons Li Xián the Prince of Yong and Li Xiǎn the Prince of Zhou (note tone difference) lead the two teams in a competition. Hao, immediately argued against it:

The two princes are still young, and their interests and ambitions are still not certain. They should be taught to yield to and love each other. Dividing the musicians into two teams to compete may create undesirable consequences, as the musicians are all uneducated who do not speak appropriately, and I am afraid that during the heat of the competition they would joke or curse each other. This is no way to honor rightful behavior and seek accord.

Both Emperor Gaozong and Empress Wu was surprised by but agreed with Hao, and both cancelled the competition.

Over the many years, especially in 675, Emperor Gaozong, suffering from a dizzying illness (may be hypertension) that caused serious headaches, considered making his powerful and domineering wife Empress Wu regent and she would formally rule the empire. He consulted the chancellors, and Hao spoke against it:

It is natural that the emperor governs the state, and the empress governs the palace. The emperor and empress are like the sun and moon, the yin and yang; each has proper responsibilities. If Your Imperial Majesty violates these natural laws, I am afraid that you will offend heaven and surprise the people. In the old days, Emperor Wen of Wei had ordered that empresses are not even allowed to be regents after their husbands' deaths, and now Your Imperial Majesty wants to pass the throne to the Heavenly Empress [(i.e., Empress Wu)]. This empire is the empire founded by Emperors Gaozu and Taizong, not you. Your Imperial Majesty needs to protect the ancestral temple and pass the throne to your son, not to anyone else, and cannot be partial to the clan of the empress. I hope you will accept my words.

Another official, Li Yiyan, also spoke against the idea, and Emperor Gaozong did not carry it out and still Empress Wu continued to "Ruling behind the curtain." From that point on, because of Hao's opposition, Empress Wu was said to be resentful of Hao, but as Hao always acted appropriately and was without fault, she could not find a way to accuse him of crimes, instead in 675, she decided to divide the chancellors power within the government to prevent future opposition to her power, and by forming her own literary scholars, the "North Gate Scholars", she divided power between the State Secretariat and her secret secretariat. Later in 675, Emperor Gaozong made Hao Zhongshu Ling (中書令), the head of the legislative bureau and a post considered one for a chancellor. In 677, he gave Hao an additional title as staff member for Li Xián, who had become crown prince after Li Hong's death in 675, as well as the honorific Jinzi Guanglu Daifu (金紫光祿大夫). In 679, Hao was made Shizhong (侍中), the head of the examination bureau and still chancellor. In spring 681, he was made advisor to Li Xiǎn (whose name had been changed by this point to Li Zhe), who was made crown prince in 680 following Li Xián's removal. Hao was by Empress Wu removed from his post as chancellor. He died later that year and was buried with great honor, but at the request that Hao himself had made prior to his death, submitted by his son Hao Beisou (郝北叟), not with great amount of material.

== Posthumous developments ==
After Emperor Gaozong's death around the new year 684, Li Zhe initially took the throne (as Emperor Zhongzong), but in spring 684, after he showed signs of disobeying Empress Wu (who had become empress dowager and regent by that point), she deposed him and replaced him with his brother Li Dan (as Emperor Ruizong). Empress Dowager Wu held power firmly and encouraged reports of treason. In 688, a servant of Hao Chujun's grandson Hao Xiangxian (郝象賢) falsely accused Hao Xiangxian of plotting treason. Empress Dowager Wu put one of her favorite secret police officers Zhou Xing (周興) in charge of the investigation. Zhou found Hao Xiangxian guilty and sentenced him and his clan to death. On the way to the execution field, Hao Xiangxian cursed Empress Dowager Wu and accused her of all kinds of adulterous and otherwise inappropriate behavior, and at one point jumped out of the cart and took firewood to combat the soldiers escorting him. The soldiers killed him. Empress Dowager Wu ordered that Hao Xiangxian's body be cut into pieces, and that Hao Chujun's and Hao Xiangxian's father's tombs be dug open, the caskets be destroyed, and the bones be burned. From this point on, until Empress Dowager Wu's death, every time that a prisoner was to be executed, the executioners would stuff his or her mouth with a wooden sphere.

== Notes and references ==
- Old Book of Tang, vol. 84.
- New Book of Tang, vol. vol. 115.
- Zizhi Tongjian, vols. 201, 202, 204.
