= Zhang Xingcheng =

Zhang Xingcheng 張行成
- Born: 587; Anguo, Hebei
- Died: October 10, 653 (aged 65–66)
- Other names: Deli (德立); Duke Ding of Beiping (北平定公)
- Occupation: Statesman

Zhang Xingcheng (587 – October 10, 653), courtesy name Deli, posthumously known as Duke Ding of Beiping, was a Chinese official who served as a chancellor during the reigns of the emperors Taizong and Gaozong in the Tang dynasty.

== Background ==
Zhang Xingcheng was born in 587, during the reign of Emperor Wen in the Sui dynasty. He was from Ding Prefecture (定州, roughly modern Baoding, Hebei), and in his youth, he studied under a man named Liu Xuan (劉炫). Liu was impressed with his studiousness, and told his other students, "Mr. Zhang does what is proper, and he is material to be an imperial official later." Toward the end of the reign of Emperor Wen's son, Emperor Yang, Zhang was recommended by the officials of his home commandery, and he was made a reserve assistant to the imperial surveyor. After Emperor Yang was killed at Jiangdu (江都, in modern Yangzhou, Jiangsu), in 618 in a coup led by the general Yuwen Huaji, the Sui officials at the eastern capital Luoyang supported Emperor Yang's grandson, Yang Tong (the Prince of Yue), as emperor, but the official Wang Shichong seized the throne in 619, ending Sui and establishing his own state of Zheng. Wang made Zhang his minister of census.

== During Emperors Gaozu's and Taizong's reigns ==
In 621, Wang Shichong's Zheng state was destroyed by forces from the faction that would later become the Tang dynasty. As Zhang had been a Sui official before, he was made the sheriff of Gushou County (穀熟, in modern Shangqiu, Henan). Later, after he passed an imperial examination, he was made the secretary general of Fuping County (富平, in modern Weinan, Shaanxi), and was considered capable in his position. After his term of office was over, he was made an assistant imperial censor, and was known for willing to submit accusations against other officials for misbehavior notwithstanding their honorable positions. The second Tang emperor, Emperor Taizong, the reigning emperor at the time, was impressed by him, and stated to his chancellor Fang Xuanling, "In both history and current times, officials often came into their offices due to recommendations by others. But I selected Zhang Xincheng myself, without anyone else's recommendations." On one occasion, possibly in 627, when Emperor Taizong, at an imperial feast, began to talk about differences between people from the Guanzhong region and those from the Shandong region (i.e., those from east of modern Sanmenxia, Henan, not those from modern Shandong), Zhang found the talk to be inappropriate, and stated, "Your subject has heard that the Son of Heaven should view the entire empire as his home, and should not divide it through geographical limitations; if you do so, you will show prejudice." Emperor Taizong was impressed, and awarded Zhang a horse, a set of clothing, and money. He also began to consult Zhang on important matters and promoted Zhang to the post of imperial attendant. In 641, Emperor Taizong, at an imperial gathering, made the comment, "Although I am the lord of the empire, but I also often have to serve as general and chancellor." After Zhang withdrew from Emperor Taizong's presence, he submitted a note indicating his belief that the comment was inappropriate—noting that it sounded like he was arguing over achievements with his subjects. Emperor Taizong approved of his comment.

By 643, when Emperor Taizong deposed his eldest son and crown prince Li Chengqian (over Li Chengqian's plotting to overthrow him) and replaced him with Li Zhi, Zhang was the assistant minister of justice. Emperor Taizong, when selecting staff members for Li Zhi, selected Zhang as an assistant head of the crown prince's household. In 645, during Emperor Taizong's campaign against Goguryeo, Emperor Taizong left Li Zhi at Zhang's home, Ding Prefecture, to be in charge of logistics, assisted by a number of officials led by the chancellor Gao Shilian, and Zhang was a member of Li Zhi's staff there. Li Zhi told Zhang, "This gives you a chance to return home in honor." He also gave Zhang supplies to allow him to worship his ancestors, and Zhang took this opportunity to recommend a number of scholars from his home, and while Li Zhi rejected making them officials (on the account that they were too old in age), he gave them rewards. After Emperor Taizong returned to the capital Chang'an after the Goguryeo campaign, he had Zhang serve as surveyor of the Henan region, and after that tour made him the acting assistant head of the executive bureau of government.

In 646, Emperor Taizong, in the aftermaths of the collapse of Tang's one-time vassal and adversary Xueyantuo to the north, went to the important northern defense prefecture of Ling Prefecture (靈州, roughly modern Yinchuan, Ningxia), to try to affirm the faith of the former vassals of Xueyantuo, who were by now directly Tang vassals. Initially, he was taking Li Zhi with him, but Zhang submitted a petition stating that this would better serve as an opportunity for Li Zhi to serve as regent at Chang'an, so that he could become familiar with imperial governance. Emperor Taizong agreed, and rewarded Zhang by giving him the honorific title of Yinqing Guanglu Daifu (銀青光祿大夫).

== During Emperor Gaozong's reign ==
In 649, Emperor Taizong became ill and died in Cuiwei Palace (翠微宮) after entrusting Li Zhi to two chancellors, Li Zhi's maternal uncle, Zhangsun Wuji, and Chu Suiliang. Keeping the news of Emperor Taizong's death secret, Zhangsun and Chu accompanied Li Zhi and Emperor Taizong's casket back to Chang'an and, after carrying out a number of official commissions, including commissioning Zhang Xingcheng as Shizhong (侍中) —the head of the examination bureau and a post considered one for a chancellor—announced Emperor Taizong's death. With Zhang and fellow chancellor Gao Jifu physically assisting him, Li Zhi took the throne (as Emperor Gaozong). He enfeoffed Zhang as the Duke of Beiping and made him one of the officials in charge of editing imperial history.

In 651, Zhang was made a head of the executive bureau, also considered a post for a chancellor, although he also carried a secondary title as de facto chancellor. In 652, when Emperor Gaozong appointed his eldest son, Li Zhong, crown prince, Zhang received the additional title as an advisor to the crown prince. He died in 653. After Emperor Gaozong's death in 684, Zhang was one of the officials enshrined into Emperor Gaozong's temple.

== Notes and references ==
- Old Book of Tang, vol. 78.
- New Book of Tang, vol. 104.
- Zizhi Tongjian, vols. 196, 197, 198, 199.
