= Emperor Gaozong of Tang =

Emperor of Tang Dynasty of China (r.649 - 683)

Emperor Gaozong of Tang 唐高宗

Emperor of the Tang dynasty
- Reign: 15 July 649 – 27 December 683
- Enthronement: 15 July 649
- Predecessor: Emperor Taizong
- Successor: Emperor Zhongzong
- Regent: Empress Wu

Crown Prince of the Tang dynasty
- Reign: 30 April 643 – 15 July 649
- Predecessor: Li Chengqian
- Successor: Li Zhong

Prince of Jin
- Reign: 631 – 30 April 643
- Born: 21 July 628; Lizheng Palace, Chang'an, Tang China
- Died: 27 December 683 (aged 55); Zhenguan Palace, Luoyang, Tang China
- Burial: Qian Mausoleum
- Spouse(s): Empress Wang (dep. 655); Empress Zetian (m. 651)
- Issue Detail: Li Zhong, Prince of Yan; Grand Princess Jincheng; Li Sujie, Prince of Xu; Li Hong, Emperor Yizong of Tang; Princess Si of Anding; Li Xián, Crown Prince Zhanghuai; Li Xiǎn, Emperor Zhongzong of Tang; Li Dan, Emperor Ruizong of Tang; Princess Taiping
Names
- Family name: Li (李); Milk name: Zhinu (雉奴); Given name: Zhi (治); Courtesy name: Weishan (為善)
Posthumous name
- Short: Heavenly Sovereign Great Emperor (Note: Given after his death in Dec 683 or in early 684) (天皇大帝); Full: Emperor Tianhuang Dasheng Dahong Xiao (Note: Given on 5 March 754 (guiyou day of the 2nd month of the 13th year of the Tianbao era). Emperor Xuanzong's biography in New Book of Tang only indicated that the posthumous names of several ancestors were lengthened on that day, without providing additional details.) (天皇大聖大弘孝皇帝)
Temple name
- Gaozong (高宗)
- House: Li
- Dynasty: Tang
- Father: Emperor Taizong of Tang
- Mother: Empress Wende

Tang Gaozong
- Chinese: 唐高宗
- Literal meaning: "High Ancestor of the Tang"
Transcriptions
Standard Mandarin
- Hanyu Pinyin: Táng Gāozōng
Yue: Cantonese
- Yale Romanization: Tòhng Gōujūng

Li Zhi
- Chinese: 李治
- Literal meaning: (personal name)
Transcriptions
Standard Mandarin
- Hanyu Pinyin: Lǐ Zhì

Emperor Gaozong of Tang (21 July 628 – 27 December 683), personal name Li Zhi, was the third emperor of the Tang dynasty of China from 649 until his death in 683; after January 665, he handed power over the empire to his second wife Empress Wu (the future Wu Zetian), and her decrees were carried out with greater force than the decrees of Emperor Gaozong. Emperor Gaozong was the youngest son of Emperor Taizong and Empress Zhangsun; his elder brothers were Li Chengqian and Li Tai.

Emperor Gaozong's reign saw the primacy of Empress Wu, who became the effective power behind the Tang rule. Empress Wu aided Emperor Gaozong in his rule during the later years of his reign after a series of strokes left him incapacitated. Emperor Gaozong effectively after January 665 delegated all matters of state to Empress Wu; after that the empress acted as the power behind the emperor, "hanging the curtain and listening to politics" (垂簾聼政; Chuílián tīngzhèng). Gaozong's personal illness, affection and trust of Wu led to her wielding a great deal of power in affairs of state until the end of his reign. From official histories from the later Tang Dynasty to contemporary historians, there exists a lively debate about whether Wu exerted undue influence on Gaozong, or whether they were equal partners in the government. Empress Wu was partially in control of power from November 660 and then totally from January 665 to December 683; there was an equality of power between Gaozong and Wu, which caused them to be called "two saints" (二聖; Er Sheng, literally two emperors) both inside and outside. After Emperor Gaozong died in December 683, power fell completely and solely into the hands of Empress Wu, acting as Empress Dowager-regent, "presiding over court and issuing edicts" (臨朝稱制; lin chao chengzhi); she subsequently became the only empress regnant in Chinese history. After his death, he was interred at the Qian Mausoleum on 25 September 684. After Wu Zetian's death in 705, she was also buried at Qian Mausoleum.

During the first part of his reign, Tang territorial gains, which started with his father Emperor Taizong, continued, including the conquest of Baekje, Goguryeo, and the Western Turkic Khaganate, but throughout the 670s, much of those gains were lost to the Tibetan Empire, Silla, Khitans, and Balhae. Further, territory previously conquered that belonged to both the Göktürks and the Western Turkic Khaganate were subjected to repeated rebellions.

== Background and life as Prince of Jin ==
Li Zhi was born in 628. He was the ninth son of his father, Emperor Taizong, and the third son of his mother, Emperor Taizong's wife Empress Zhangsun. In 631, he was named the Prince of Jin. In 633, he was made commandant of Bing Prefecture (并州, roughly modern Taiyuan, Shanxi), but remained at the capital Chang'an rather than reporting to Bing Prefecture. When Empress Zhangsun died in 636, Emperor Taizong was particularly touched by the grief that Li Zhi displayed, and from that point on particularly favored him. Sometime while he was the Prince of Jin, at the recommendation of his grand aunt Princess Tong'an, he married the grandniece of Princess Tong'an's husband Wang Yu (王裕) as his wife and princess.

Meanwhile, Li Zhi's two older brothers by Empress Zhangsun, Li Chengqian the Crown Prince and Li Tai the Prince of Wei, were locked in an intense rivalry, as Li Tai was favored by Emperor Taizong for his talent and was trying to displace Li Chengqian. Li Chengqian, in fear, entered into a conspiracy with the general Hou Junji, his uncle Li Yuanchang (李元昌) the Prince of Han, the imperial guard commander Li Anyan (李安儼), and his brothers-in-law Zhao Jie (趙節, who was also his cousin) and Du He (杜荷) to overthrow Emperor Taizong. The plot was discovered in 643, and Emperor Taizong deposed Li Chengqian. He was initially going to make Li Tai the new crown prince, but later began to believe that Li Tai's machinations were responsible for Li Chengqian's downfall. The powerful chancellor Zhangsun Wuji – Empress Zhangsun's brother—suggested that he make Li Zhi crown prince, a possibility that Li Tai was apprehensive about. Li Tai tried to intimidate Li Zhi, who had been friendly with Li Yuanchang, by pointing out to Li Zhi that Li Yuanchang had been part of the plot and that he should be concerned for himself. When Emperor Taizong noticed Li Zhi worrying about this and was told by Li Zhi of Li Tai's intimidation, Emperor Taizong's mind became set. He exiled Li Tai, and on 30 April 643, (Note: According to Taizong's biography in the Old Book of Tang, Li Zhi was made crown prince on the bingxu day of the 4th month of the 17th year of the Zhenguan era of Taizong's reign. This date corresponds to 30 Apr 643 on the Gregorian calendar.) he created Li Zhi the new crown prince. He made Zhangsun and two other senior chancellors, Fang Xuanling and Xiao Yu, senior advisors to Li Zhi, and made another chancellor, Li Shiji, the head of Li Zhi's household. At the advice of another key official, Liu Ji, who pointed out that the crown prince needed to have a group of well-learned scholars that he was close to, Emperor Taizong appointed Liu, as well as Cen Wenben, Chu Suiliang, and Ma Zhou, to serve as Li Zhi's friends and advisors.

== As Crown Prince ==
Late in 643, Emperor Taizong issued an edict to select beautiful women among good households to serve as Li Zhi's concubines. However, after Li Zhi declined such treatment, Emperor Taizong cancelled the edict. However, during his years as crown prince, he was said to have favored his concubine Pure Consort Xiao, having two daughters (the later Princesses Yiyang and Xuan Cheng) and one son (Li Sujie) with her, much to the chagrin of his wife Crown Princess Wang, who was childless and jealous of Consort Xiao. Three other concubines of his bore his other sons Li Zhong, Li Xiao (李孝), and Li Shangjin (李上金).

Around the same time, however, Emperor Taizong also became concerned that Li Zhi, who was considered kind but weak in character, would not be strong enough to be an emperor, and secretly discussed with Zhangsun Wuji the possibility of making another son by his concubine Consort Yang (daughter of Emperor Yang of Sui), Li Ke the Prince of Wu, crown prince. Zhangsun repeatedly opposed the idea, and Emperor Taizong did not carry this out.

In 645, when Emperor Taizong launched a campaign against Goguryeo, he took Li Zhi with him to Ding Prefecture (定州, roughly modern Baoding, Hebei) and then left Li Zhi there to be in charge of logistics, before heading to the front himself. He also left senior officials Gao Shilian, Liu Ji, Ma Zhou, Zhang Xingcheng, and Gao Jifu to assist Li Zhi. After the campaign ended in failure later that year, as Emperor Taizong was leading the army back from the front, Li Zhi went to meet him at Linyu Pass (臨渝關, now Shanhai Pass). Emperor Taizong suffered an injury during the campaign, and Li Zhi was said to have, as Emperor Taizong's conditions were getting worse, sucked the pus out of his wound, until Emperor Taizong recovered somewhat. In 646, with Emperor Taizong still recovering, he transferred some of the imperial authorities to Li Zhi. Li Zhi stayed at the imperial palace and attended to Emperor Taizong in his illness. That year, when Emperor Taizong was due to visit Ling Prefecture (靈州, roughly modern Yinchuan, Ningxia) to meet with a number of tribal chiefs who were formerly vassals of Xueyantuo—which had collapsed under Tang and Huige attacks earlier that year—he was set to take Li Zhi with him, but at Zhang's suggestion left Li Zhi in charge at Chang'an instead, to allow Li Zhi to become more familiar with the important affairs of state in his absence. After Emperor Taizong returned from Ling Prefecture, he retained for himself the authorities over imperial worship, state guests, military, the commissioning of officers of higher than the fifth rank, and executions, and transferred all other authorities to Li Zhi.

In 647, a commoner named Duan Zhichong (段志沖) submitted a petition to Emperor Taizong, asking him to pass the throne to Li Zhi. Li Zhi, concerned that Emperor Taizong might be offended, was worried and grieving, and Zhangsun suggested that Duan be executed. Emperor Taizong did not take offense and did not punish Duan or Li Zhi. Meanwhile, Li Zhi began to build a Buddhist temple named Daci'en Temple (大慈恩寺) in commemoration of his mother Empress Zhangsun, and the temple was completed in 648.

In 649, while at the summer palace Cuiwei Palace (翠微宮, in the Qin Mountains), Emperor Taizong was gravely ill, and he, while impressed with Li Shiji's abilities, was concerned that Li Shiji was too able and would not submit to Li Zhi. He stated to Li Zhi: (Note: In Li Shiji's biographies in both Books of Tang, there was no mention of Taizong imploring Gaozong to execute Li.)

Li Shiji is full of ability and wisdom, but you had done him no favors, and it may be difficult for him to be faithful to you. I am going to exile him now. If he leaves immediately, promote him to be Puye [(僕射, head of the important examination bureau of the government)] and trust him after I die. If he hesitates, execute him.

He then demoted Li Shiji to the post of the commandant of Die Prefecture (疊州, roughly modern Gannan Tibetan Autonomous Prefecture, Gansu). Li Shiji, realizing what was happening, after receiving the order, departed without hesitation.

As Emperor Taizong's illness was getting more serious, Li Zhi continuously attended to him and wept constantly, often going without food, which touched Emperor Taizong greatly. Emperor Taizong entrusted Li Zhi to Zhangsun and Chu Suiliang, and then died on 10 July 649. Initially, Li Zhi was so mournful that he could not carry out any actions other than holding onto the necks of Zhangsun and Chu. Zhangsun, while mourning himself, reminded Li Zhi that he was now in charge of the empire and must act accordingly. Zhangsun also ordered that Emperor Taizong's death not be announced for the time being, and then, the next day, accompanied Li Zhi back to Chang'an. Zhangsun issued several edicts in Emperor Taizong's name—including making Yu Zhining, Zhang, and Gao Jifu chancellors. Two days later, Emperor Taizong's death was officially announced. On 15 July, Li Zhi took the throne (as Emperor Gaozong).

== Reign as Emperor ==
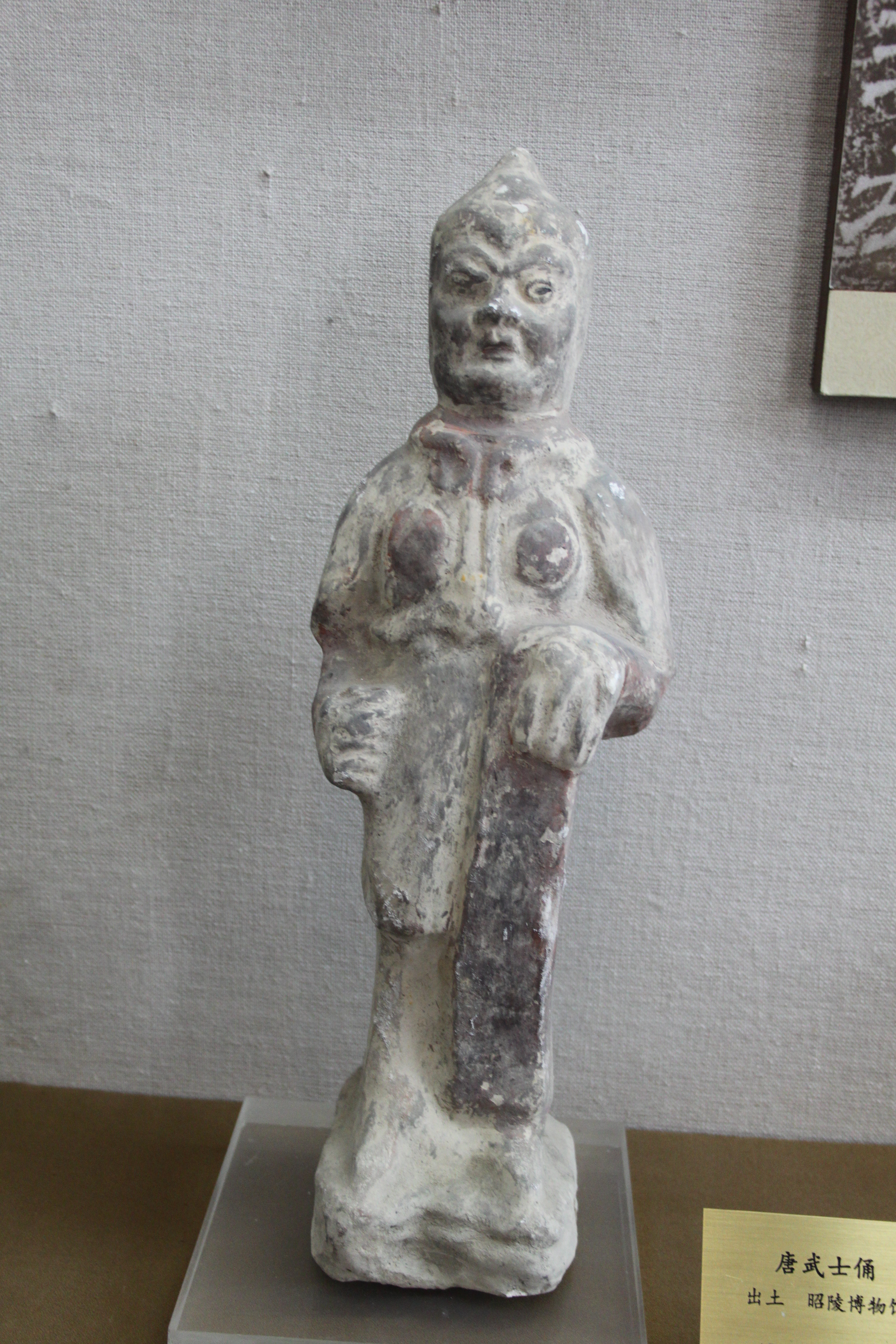
Tang shieldbearer

During his 34-year reign, he was unable to exercise power alone and was under the control of several of his great ministers and his wife, Empress Wu. The order of the regents were:

- Zhangsun Wuji (649-659)
- Chu Suiliang (649-655)
- Empress Wu (660-683)

=== Early reign: Political struggles ===
==== Yonghui era (650–656) ====
Emperor Gaozong's first move as emperor was to cancel a second campaign against Goguryeo that Emperor Taizong had planned for later 649. While Li Tai was disallowed from attending Emperor Taizong's funeral, Emperor Gaozong permitted him to again have a staff and be allowed to use wagons, clothes, and foods of high quality. Emperor Gaozong created his wife Crown Princess Wang empress and made her father Wang Renyou (王仁祐) the Duke of Wei. It was said that early in Emperor Gaozong's reign, he greatly respected both his uncle Zhangsun Wuji and Chu Suiliang and followed their advice, and that therefore, during this part of his reign, the government was organized well and the people were comforted, much like during the reign of Emperor Taizong, although in winter 650, Chu was accused of forcibly purchasing private land and paying below-market price, and was demoted to be a prefectural prefect. (Chu eventually returned to power in 653.)

Also in 650, the general Gao Kan (高侃) – whose army had been launched by Emperor Taizong against the newly reconstituted Göktürk state under Chebi Khan Ashina Hubo prior to Emperor Taizong's death—captured Ashina Hubo and brought him back to Chang'an. Emperor Gaozong spared Ashina Hubo and made him a general, putting his people directly under Tang rule. Meanwhile, with two of the states of the Western Regions previously conquered by Tang and governed by Tang-installed kings, Kucha and Karasahr in disturbance, Emperor Taizong returned their previously captured kings, Bai Helibushibi (白訶黎布失畢) and Long Tuqizhi (龍突騎支) respectively, to their thrones.

In 651, the Western Turkic Khaganate prince Ashina Helu, who had sought and received protection from Emperor Taizong, broke away from Tang and defeated the Western Turkic Khaganate's Yipishekui Khan, taking over the Western Turkic Khaganate himself and no longer subordinate under Tang. In fall 651, Ashina Helu attacked Tang's Ting Prefecture (庭州, roughly Changji Hui Autonomous Prefecture, Xinjiang), and Emperor Gaozong responded by commissioning the generals Liang Jianfang (梁建方) and Qibi Heli (契苾何力) to attack Ashina Helu. Liang and Qibi achieved some victories against Ashina Helu's general Zhuxie Guzhu (朱邪孤注), but then withdrew without engaging Ashina Helu.

Meanwhile, as Empress Wang was sonless, her uncle, the chancellor Liu Shi, suggested to her that she ask Emperor Gaozong to create his oldest son Li Zhong, whose mother Consort Liu was of low birth and therefore considered nonthreatening, crown prince so that Li Zhong would be grateful of her in the future. Liu also persuaded Zhangsun to suggest the idea as well, and in fall 652, Emperor Gaozong created Li Zhong crown prince.

By this point, however, Empress Wang was facing a major threat from another romantic rival. When Emperor Gaozong was crown prince, he had an affair with one of Emperor Taizong's concubines, Consort Wu. After Emperor Taizong's death, all of his concubines who did not bear sons, which included Wu, were housed at Ganye Temple (感業寺) to be Buddhist nuns. In either 650 or 651, Emperor Gaozong was visiting Ganye Temple to offer incense to Buddha when he saw Consort Wu. Both of them wept. When Empress Wang heard this, she, wanting to divert Emperor Gaozong's favor from Consort Xiao, secretly instructed Consort Wu to grow her hair back, while suggesting to Emperor Gaozong that he take her as a concubine. Consort Wu was intelligent and full of machinations, and therefore, when she first returned to the palace, she acted humbly and flattered Empress Wang, who trusted her greatly and recommended her to Emperor Gaozong. Soon, Emperor Gaozong became enamored with Consort Wu.

Meanwhile, Emperor Gaozong's sister Princess Gaoyang and her husband Fang Yi'ai (房遺愛, Fang Xuanling's son), were implicated in 652 of conspiring with another brother-in-law Chai Lingwu (柴令武), the general Xue Wanche (薛萬徹) and Emperor Gaozong's uncle Li Yuanjing (李元景) the Prince of Jing to make Li Yuanjing emperor. Fang, knowing that Zhangsun had long been apprehensive of Li Ke, falsely implicated Li Ke in the plot as well, hoping to ingratiate Zhangsun sufficiently that he would be spared. nevertheless, in spring 653, at the suggestion of Zhangsun and Cui Dunli – despite Emperor Gaozong's initial inclination to spare Li Yuanjing and Li Ke—Emperor Gaozong ordered that Fang, Xue, and Chai be executed, and that Li Yuanjing, Li Ke, and the Princesses Gaoyang and Baling (Chai's wife) be forced to commit suicide. Zhangsun took this opportunity to accuse several other officials friendly with Fang or hostile to him—the chancellor Yuwen Jie, Li Daozong the Prince of Jiangxia, and the general Zhishi Sili (執失思力) – of being friendly with Fang and had them exiled. He also deposed and exiled Li Ke's mother Consort Yang and Consort Yang's other son Li Yin (李愔) the Prince of Shu, as well as Fang's brother Fang Yizhi (房遺直) and Xue's brother Xue Wanbei (薛萬備).

By 654, both Empress Wang and Consort Xiao had lost favor with Emperor Gaozong, and the former romantic rivals joined forces against Consort Wu, but to no avail, and as a sign of his love to Consort Wu, in 654 he conferred posthumous honors on her father Wu Shihuo (武士彠). Later that year, Consort Wu gave birth to a daughter that died shortly after birth. Evidence implicated Empress Wang as the killer, although some historians believe Consort Wu killed her own daughter in order to frame Empress Wang, but no concrete evidence of this exists. In anger, Emperor Gaozong considered deposing Empress Wang and replacing her with Consort Wu, but wanted to make sure that the chancellors would support this, and so visited Zhangsun's house with Consort Wu, awarding him with much treasure, but when he brought up the topic that Empress Wang was sonless (as an excuse for deposing her), Zhangsun repeatedly found ways to divert the conversation, and subsequent visits by Consort Wu's mother Lady Yang and the official Xu Jingzong, who was allied with Consort Wu, to seek support from Zhangsun were also to no avail.

In summer 655, Consort Wu accused Empress Wang and her mother Lady Liu of using witchcraft. In response, Emperor Gaozong barred Lady Liu from the palace and demoted Liu Shi. Meanwhile, a faction of officials began to form around Consort Wu, including Li Yifu, Xu, Cui Yixuan (崔義玄), and Yuan Gongyu (袁公瑜). On an occasion in fall 655, Emperor Gaozong summoned the chancellors Zhangsun, Li Shiji (who by now was using the name Li Ji to observe naming taboo for Emperor Taizong's name Li Shimin), Yu Zhining, and Chu to the palace—which Chu deduced to be regarding the matter of changing the empress. Li Ji claimed an illness and refused to attend. At the meeting, Chu vehemently opposed deposing Empress Wang, while Zhangsun and Yu showed their disapproval by silence. Meanwhile, other chancellors Han Yuan and Lai Ji also opposed the move, but when Emperor Gaozong asked Li Ji again, Li Ji's response was, "This is your family matter, Your Imperial Majesty. Why ask anyone else?" (Note: When annotating the Zizhi Tongjian, Hu Sanxing noted that just like how Emperor Taizong had calculated measures to guard against Li Shiji, Li Shiji similarly had calculated measures while serving his sovereigns.) Emperor Gaozong therefore became resolved. He demoted Chu to be a commandant at Tan Prefecture (roughly modern Changsha, Hunan), and then deposed both Empress Wang and Consort Xiao, putting them under arrest and creating Consort Wu empress (皇后, huánghòu) and the most powerful woman in the empire (天下母, Tiānxià Mǔ) (Note: The term tianxia mu appeared in Pei Yan's biography in New Book of Tang.) instead to replace Empress Wang. (Note: Later that year, Empress Wang and Consort Xiao were killed on orders by the new Empress Wu after Emperor Gaozong showed signs of considering their release.) Then, at Xu's suggestion, in spring 656, Emperor Gaozong demoted Li Zhong to be the Prince of Liang and created Empress Wu's oldest son Li Hong the Prince of Dai crown prince instead.

In 655 as well, Emperor Gaozong commissioned the general Cheng Zhijie (程知節) to attack Ashina Helu, but while the campaign saw some victories over Western Turkic Khaganate's substituent tribes Geluolu (歌邏祿) and Chuyue (處月), it was hindered by Cheng's inability to restrain his assistant Wang Wendu (王文度) from pillaging and inappropriately halting the army. After the campaign ended in early 657, both Cheng and Wang were deposed from their offices.

==== Xianqing era (656–661) ====
In 657, Emperor Gaozong commissioned the general Su Dingfang, who had served under Cheng Zhijie in the earlier failed campaign, to command a campaign against Ashina Helu, assisted by Ren Yaxiang and Xiao Siye (蕭嗣業). They were joined by the Western Turkic Khaganate's leaders Ashina Mishe and Ashina Buzhen, who had submitted to Tang during Emperor Taizong's reign. The campaign caught Ashina Helu by surprise, and Su defeated him in several battles, causing him to flee to the kingdom Shi (石國, centering modern Tashkent, Uzbekistan), which arrested him and delivered him to Su, thus largely ending the Western Turkic Khaganate as an organized state. (Emperor Gaozong would try to continue the Western Turkic Khaganate's existence as a vassal stage by dividing it in half and creating Ashina Mishe and Ashina Buzhen as khans of the two halves.)

Meanwhile, Xu Jingzong and Li Yifu, aligned with Empress Wu, and became strong enough to fight for power, began to carry out a campaign of reprisal on her behalf. Empress Wu, on the other hand, persuaded Emperor Gaozong to work with the removal of the chancellors appointed by Emperor Taizong to consolidate the emperor's power. In 657, they accused Han Yuan and Lai Ji of plotting treason with Chu Suiliang, who was then serving as the commandant at Gui Prefecture (桂州, roughly modern Guilin, Guangxi). Emperor Gaozong demoted Han and Lai to be prefects of distant prefectures, and demoted Chu and Liu Shi to even more distant prefectures—in Chu's case, to the extremely distant Ai Prefecture (愛州, roughly modern Thanh Hóa Province, Vietnam), and Chu's subsequent petition, sent from Ai Prefecture, pleading with Emperor Gaozong, fell on deaf ears.

Empress Wu's reprisals did not end there. In 659, Zhangsun Wuji became the next target. At that time, two low level officials, Wei Jifang (韋季方) and Li Chao (李巢) had been accused of improper associations, and when Emperor Gaozong put Xu and Xin Maojiang of investigating, Xu falsely accused Wei and Li to be part of a treasonous plot by Zhangsun. Emperor Gaozong, without meeting with Zhangsun, believed Xu, and put Zhangsun under house arrest in exile at Qian Prefecture (黔州, roughly modern southeastern Chongqing). Xu further implicated Chu, Liu, Han, and Yu Zhining in the plot as well. Yu was removed from his post. Chu, who had died in 658, was posthumously stripped of all titles, and his sons Chu Yanfu (褚彥甫) and Chu Yanchong (褚彥沖) were executed. Orders were also issued to execute Liu and Han, although Han died before the execution order reached his location. Meanwhile, Zhangsun, once he reached his place of exile, was forced to commit suicide. It was said that after Han's and Lai's deaths, no official dared to criticize the emperor any further.

Also in 659, a vassal of Western Turkic Khaganate (Pin. Tujue), Duman (都曼), the commander of the Esegels (aka Izgil, Old Turkic: 𐰔𐰏𐰠, Ch. Asijie, Sijie 思結) Tribe, rebelled against Tang occupation, along with the Western Turkic Khaganate's subject kingdoms Shule (疏勒), Zhujupo (朱俱波), and Yebantuo (謁般陀) (all in modern Kashgar, Xinjiang). The joint forces commanded by Duman quickly defeated the Tang vassal Yutian (于田, in modern Hotan, Xinjiang). In winter 659, Emperor Gaozong sent Su Dingfang against Duman, and once he arrived in the vicinity of Duman's army, he selected 10,000 infantry soldiers and 3,000 cavalry soldiers and made a surprise attack on Duman. When he arrived at Duman's headquarters, Duman was surprised, and after Su initially defeated Duman, Duman was forced to withdraw within the city. Su put the city under siege, and Duman surrendered. In spring 660, Su took Duman back to the eastern capital Luoyang, where Emperor Gaozong was at the time, to present Duman to him. Some officials requested that Duman be executed, but Su made a plea on Duman's behalf—that he had promised Duman life before Duman surrendered—and Emperor Gaozong stated that while under the law, Duman should die, he would honor Su's promise, and so he spared Duman.

On the other end of the Tang atmosphere of influence, on the Korean Peninsula, Baekje had been attacking the Tang ally Silla. Once Su returned from the Esegel campaign, Emperor Gaozong commissioned him to head over the sea to attack Baekje, in conjunction with Silla. Su quickly captured the Baekje capital Sabi, forcing Baekje's King Uija and his crown prince Buyeo Yung to surrender. Emperor Gaozong ordered that Baekje be annexed as Tang territory. Emperor Gaozong then followed up by commissioning Su, along with Qibi Heli, Liu Boying (劉伯英), and Cheng Mingzhen (程名振), to attack Goguryeo.

In 660, Emperor Gaozong and Empress Wu toured Bian Prefecture (modern-day Taiyuan), and Empress Wu had the opportunity to invite her old neighbors and relatives to a feast. Later that year, Emperor Gaozong began to suffer from an illness that carried the symptoms of painful headaches, persistent dizziness, occasional seizures and loss of vision, generally thought to be hypertension-related or stroke, and Emperor Gaozong began to have Empress Wu make rulings on petitions and suggestions made by officials. It was said that Empress Wu had quick reactions and understood both literature and history, and therefore, she was making correct and error-free rulings. Emperor Gaozong's illness worsened over time, and lasted until his death. If he was well, he also would accept Empress Wu's help, asking her to read the documents to him, he consulted with her on important matters and write down the rulings he had issued. Even until midnight, when he was exploring the memorials, he had Empress Wu by his side to decide if anything went wrong, and he became very dependent on her advice over time, and, as usual, because of his illness, he allowed Empress Wu to act in his name. Thereafter, her authority rivaled Emperor Gaozong's, after this point on, Empress Wu became the undisputed power behind the throne until the death of Emperor Gaozong.

=== Middle reign: Empress Wu's aggrandization of power ===
==== Longshuo and Linde eras (661–666) ====
Meanwhile, just after Su Dingfang left Baekje territory to attack Goguryeo, the Buddhist monk Dochim (道琛) and the former Baekje general Gwisil Boksin rose to try to revive Baekje. They welcomed the Baekje prince Buyeo Pung back from Japan to serve as king, with Juryu (주류, 周留, now Seocheon County, South Chungcheong) as their headquarters. They put the Tang general Liu Renyuan (劉仁願) under siege in Sabi. Emperor Gaozong sent the general Liu Rengui, who had previously been demoted to commoner rank for offending Li Yifu, with a relief force, and Liu Rengui and Liu Renyuan were able to fight off the Baekje resistance forces' attacks, but were themselves not strong enough to quell the rebellion, and so for some time the armies were in stalemate.

Meanwhile, Su advanced on the Goguryeo capital Pyongyang and put it under siege, but was unable to capture it quickly. In spring 662, after the general Pang Xiaotai (龐孝泰) was defeated by Goguryeo forces at Sasu River (蛇水, probably Botong River) and was killed along with his 13 sons, Su ran into harsh snowstorms and withdrew.

Around the same time, after the death of the Huige chief Yaoluoge Porun (藥羅葛婆閏), who had been obedient to Tang, Yaoluoge Porun's nephew Yaoluoge Bisudu (藥羅葛比粟毒) rose in rebellion with the Tongluo (同羅) and Pugu (僕固) tribes in conjunction with other Tiele Confederation tribes. Emperor Gaozong sent the general Zheng Rentai (鄭仁泰) to attack the Tiele, but while Zheng was initially victorious, his officers became bogged down in pillaging and eventually suffered great losses after being caught in poor weather. Emperor Gaozong instead sent Qibi, who was ethnically Tiele, assisted by Jiang Ke, to Tiele to try to persuade them to surrender. Qibi was able to do so, and rebel leaders were arrested and turned over to Tang. Qibi executed them and ended the rebellion.

Meanwhile, for reasons unknown, also in 662 Emperor Gaozong sent the general Su Haizheng (蘇海政) to attack Qiuzi and ordered Ashina Mishe and Ashina Buzhen to assist him. Ashina Buzhen, who had a rivalry with Ashina Mishe, falsely informed Su that Ashina Mishe was set to rebel and would attack the Tang army, and Su responded by ambushing Ashina Mishe, killing him and his chief assistants. The Western Turkic Khaganate tribes, angry over Ashina Mishe's death, largely turned away from Tang and submitted to the Tibetan Empire instead, and when Ashina Buzhen died later that year, Tang influence in the region was greatly reduced.

During these years, Li Yifu had been, due to favors from Emperor Gaozong and Empress Wu, exceedingly powerful, and he grew particularly corrupt. In 663, after reports of Li Yifu's corruption were made to Emperor Gaozong, Emperor Gaozong had Liu Xiangdao and Li Ji investigate, finding Li Yifu guilty. Li Yifu was removed from his post and exiled, and would never return to Chang'an.

During the years, Empress Wu had repeatedly, in her dreams, seen Empress Wang and Consort Xiao, in the states they were after their terrible deaths, and she came to believe that their spirits were after her. For that reason, Emperor Gaozong started remodeling a secondary palace, Daming Palace (大明宮), into Penglai Palace (蓬萊宮), and when Penglai Palace's main hall, Hanyuan Hall (含元殿), was completed in 663, Emperor Gaozong and Empress Wu moved to the newly remodeled palace (which was itself later renamed to Hanyuan Palace). (Note: However, Empress Wang and Consort Xiao continued to appear in her dreams even after this, and therefore, late in Emperor Gaozong's reign, he and Empress Wu were often at the eastern capital Luoyang, not at Chang'an.)

Also in 663, the Tibetan Empire attacked a Tang vassal state, the Tuyuhun. Tuyuhun's Ledou Khan Murong Nuohebo, unable to withstand the Tibetan attack, took his people and fled into Tang territory to seek protection, thus ending Tuyuhun's existence as a state.

Meanwhile, also in 663, Liu Rengui and Liu Renyuan, in conjunction with Munmu of Silla and the former Baekje crown prince Buyeo Yung, defeated Buyeo Pung and Japanese forces sent to assist him, at the Battle of Baekgang. Buyeo Pung fled to Goguryeo, ending the Baekje resistance movement. Emperor Gaozong recalled Liu Renyuan, leading Liu Rengui in charge of former Baekje territory, but in 664 sent Liu Renyuan back to Baekje and tried to recall Liu Rengui. Liu Rengui petitioned to remain to prepare for another attack on Goguryeo, and Emperor Gaozong agreed to let him remain.

By 664, Empress Wu, who felt that her power was well established, was extending her influence further in the political arena and increases her controlling behavior over Emperor Gaozong and arbitrarily makes many government decisions. According to Song dynasty historian Sima Guang in the Zizhi Tongjian:

After the Emperess's attained her will, she specialised in power and blessings; whenever the Emperor desired to do something, his actions were controlled by the Empress.

In the same year when the eunuch Wang Fusheng (王伏勝) reported to Emperor Gaozong that she had engaged the sorcerer Guo Xingzhen (郭行真) – an act that was strictly forbidden—Emperor Gaozong, in anger, summoned the chancellor Shangguan Yi to consult Shangguan. Shangguan suggested that he depose Empress Wu. He agreed, and had Shangguan draft an edict to that effect. However, Empress Wu had received information that that was happening, and she emerged to defend herself, when she reached the main palace, she saw the emperor holding a decree and asked seriously: "What is this?" And when Empress Wu found out, she cried, which prompted Emperor Gaozong to stop. Emperor Gaozong could not carry out the removal, and instead blamed Shangguan, and Emperor Gaozong said to Empress Wu: (Note: In Shangguan Yi's biography in Old Book of Tang, there was no mention of him imploring Gaozong to depose Empress Wu.)

"I did not intend to do that at first! Shangguan Yi taught me this."

As both Shangguan and Wang had previously served the former crown prince Li Zhong, Empress Wu had Xu Jingzong falsely accuse Shangguan, Wang, and Li Zhong of conspiring against Emperor Gaozong's life. Around the new year 665, Shangguan and Wang were executed, and Li Zhong was forced to commit suicide. After the executions, Empress Wu told Emperor Gaozong:

"Your Majesty, you are a wise man who manages the country in an orderly manner, but you are soft-hearted. Who do you think we are? We are husband and wife! Does our issue have anything to do with Shangguan Yi! Do you really want to abolish me when you talk about abolishing the empress in your ear? I'll go to court with you in the future to prevent such mistakes, and I will assist you in addressing government issues and analyzing suggestions from the officials and others."

Therefore, after this step, every day that Emperor Gaozong presided over imperial meetings, Empress Wu would sit behind a pearl screen behind him to hear the reports, and before the emperor can decide, he must ask the empress: therefore she got involved in everything pertaining to the empire and discussed and helped decide all "great and small" military and state affairs; her power is no different from that of the emperor. Since Empress Wu began to listen to politics in court, she established herself and Gaozong in the same position in front of the civil and military ministers of the Tang dynasty. In fact, if anyone with a request to make at Court obtains an audience or is allowed to speak, the emperor hears him indeed, but will give no definite answer of "Yes or No", referring him promptly to empress. frequently Emperor Gaozong was unable to go to the court because of a headache, and Empress Wu was "obliged" to go to the court alone and decide. As a result, she increasingly took control of great and small decisions made throughout Emperor Gaozong's reign. She and Emperor Gaozong were thereafter referred to as the "Two Saints." The extent of Empress Wu's authority from 665 until the end of Emperor Gaozong's reign was often described as:

Hanging the curtain from behind and listening and speaking in government (垂簾聽政; Chuílián tīngzhèng); "Two Saints came to the Court" (二聖臨朝; Er Sheng Lín cháo).

The Later Jin historian Liu Xu, in Old Book of Tang, commented:

The Empress of Heaven was at the helm of the country for many years, (and) her power is no different from that of the emperor. When the emperor could not listen to court matters, all affairs were decided by the Empress of Heaven. Since the execution of Shangguan Yi, whenever the emperor went to court, the Empress of Heaven hung a curtain behind the throne (垂簾聽政; Chuílián tīngzhèng). All matters of government, great or small, were settled by her, and they were called "Two Saints" (二聖; Er Sheng) inside and outside. The emperor wanted to issue an edict to let the Empress of Heaven formally take over the throne of the empire, and Hao Chujun, persuaded him to stop this issuance (appointment of regent).

According to Song dynasty historians Ouyang Xiu and Song Qi, in the New Book of Tang:

Whenever the emperor was ill, the affairs of the state were left to the empress to decide. The court and the country called them "Two Saints" (二聖; Er Sheng). Each time the emperor personally addressed court matters, a curtain hung in the hall (垂簾聽政; Chuílián tīngzhèng), and both the emperor and empress presided over the court together. It is up to empress's to decide who will be promoted and demoted, die and survive, and the emperor will carry it out. Due to the empress's order, her literary scholars could secretly participate in decisions, and this led to the division of power of the Chancellors. In the last years of the emperor's life, he was unable to do anything due to illness and everything was managed by the empress.

According to Song dynasty historian Sima Guang in the Zizhi Tongjian:

From this event onwards, whenever the emperor attended to business, the empress then hung a curtain [and listened] from behind it (垂簾聽政; Chuílián tīngzhèng). There was no matter of government, great or small, which she did not hear. The whole power of the empire passed into her hands; reward and punishment, life and death, she decided. The emperor just folded his hands and that is all. In court and country, they were called the "Two Saints" (二聖; Er Sheng).

In 665, Emperor Gaozong and his powerful wife Empress Wu went to Luoyang and began preparation in earnest to make sacrifices to heaven and earth at Mount Tai – a traditional ceremony for emperors that were rarely carried out in history due to the large expenses associated with them. At Empress Wu's request—as she reasoned that the sacrifice to earth also included sacrifices to past empresses (Emperor Gaozong's mother Empress Zhangsun and grandmother Duchess Dou, posthumously honored as an empress), she believed that it would be more appropriate to have females offer the sacrifices rather than male officials, as had been tradition in the past. Emperor Gaozong decreed that the male ministers would offer sacrifices first, but Empress Wu would next offer sacrifices, followed by Princess Dowager Yan, the mother of Emperor Gaozong's younger brother Li Zhen the Prince of Yue. In winter 665, Emperor Gaozong and Empress Wu and headed for Mount Tai. On the lunar new year (10 February 666), the mperial couple initiated the sacrifices to heaven, which were not completed until the next day. On 12 February, sacrifices were made to earth. He and she gave general promotions to the imperial officials, and it was said that starting from this time, promotions of imperial officials, which were strict and slow during the reigns of Emperors Gaozu and Taizong, began to become more relaxed and often excessive. He and Empress Wu also declared a general pardon, except for long-term exiles.

Japan, India, the Persian court in exile, Goguryeo, Baekje, Silla, the Turks, Khotan, the Khmer, and the Umayyad Caliphate all had representatives attending the Feng and Shan sacrifices held by Emperor Gaozong and Empress Wu in 666 at Mount Tai.

==== Qianfeng and Zhongzhang eras (666–670) ====
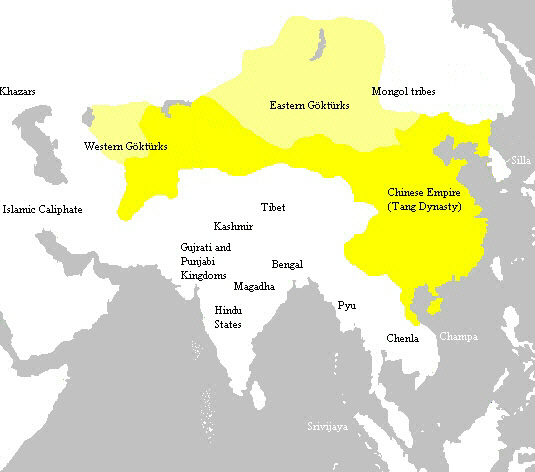
Estimated territorial extent of Emperor Gaozong's empire.

In summer 666, Yŏn Kaesomun died and was initially succeeded as Dae Mangniji by his oldest son Yŏn Namsaeng. As Yŏn Namsaeng subsequently carried out a tour of Goguryeo territory, however, rumors began to spread both that Yŏn Namsaeng was going to kill his younger brothers Yŏn Namgŏn and Yŏn Namsan, whom he had left in charge at Pyongyang, and that Yŏn Namgŏn and Yŏn Namsan were planning to rebel against Yŏn Namsaeng. When Yŏn Namsaeng subsequently sent officials close to him back to Pyongyang to try to spy on the situation, Yŏn Namgŏn arrested them and declared himself Dae Mangniji, attacking his brother. Yŏn Namsaeng sent his son (later known as Ch'ŏn Heonseong/Quan Xiancheng (泉獻誠), as Yŏn Namsaeng changed his family name from Yŏn (淵) to observe naming taboo for Emperor Gaozu, whose personal name was the same character) to Tang to seek aid. Emperor Gaozong and Empress Wu saw this as the opportunity to destroy Goguryeo, and he initially commissioned Qibi Heli to aid Yŏn Namsaeng, and also sent the generals Pang Tongshan (龐同善) and Gao Kan (高侃) to attack Goguryeo.

Meanwhile, Empress Wu's sister, the Lady of Han (who had married the low-level official Helan Yueshi (賀蘭越石)), and her daughter Lady Helan had both been frequently visiting the palace and were said to be "favored" by Emperor Gaozong. When Lady of Han died in 666, Emperor Gaozong created Lady Helan the Lady of Wei, and wanted to let her live in the palace, but hesitated because he thought Empress Wu would be jealous. When Empress Wu heard this, she was indeed jealous, and therefore she poisoned meat offered by her nephews Wu Weiliang (武惟良) and Wu Huaiyun (武懷運), who had been on poor relations with her and whose grandmother were not her mother Lady Yang; she then gave the poisonous meat to Lady Helan, who ate it and died. Empress Wu then implicated Wu Weiliang and Wu Huaiyun in Lady Helan's death and executed them.

Around the new year 667, Emperor Gaozong and Empress Wu further commissioned Li Ji to be the overall commander of the attack on Goguryeo, assisted by Hao Chujun. In fall 667, Li Ji crossed the Liao River and captured Sinseong (新城, in modern Fushun, Liaoning). The Tang forces thereafter fought off counterattacks by Yŏn Namgŏn and joined forces with Yŏn Namsaeng, although they were initially unable to cross the Yalu River. In spring 668, Li Ji turned his attention to Goguryeo's northern cities, capturing the important city Buyeo (扶餘, in modern Siping, Jilin). In fall 668, he crossed the Yalu and put Pyongyang under siege. Yŏn Namsan and King Bojang surrendered, and while Yŏn Namgŏn continued to resist in the inner city, his general, the Buddhist monk Shin Seong (信誠) turned against him and surrendered the inner city to Tang forces. Yŏn Namgŏn tried to commit suicide, but was seized and treated. This was the end of Goguryeo, and Tang annexed Goguryeo into its territory, with Xue Rengui being put initially in charge of former Goguryeo territory as protector general. Furthermore, Emperor Gaozong was much ailing, so Empress Wu took a pacifist policy, and the Tang Empire was diverting resources towards other priorities. This situation favored Silla, because soon Silla would have to forcibly resist the imposition of Chinese rule over the entire peninsula, and there was much resistance to Tang rule (fanned by Silla, which was displeased that Tang did not give the Goguryeo territory to it), and in 669, following Emperor Gaozong's and Empress Wu order, a part of the Goguryeo people were forced to move to the region between the Yangtze River and the Huai River, as well as the regions south of the Qin Mountains and west of Chang'an, only leaving old and weak inhabitants in the original land.

In 670, Wu's mother, Lady Yang, died and by Emperor Gaozong's and Empress Wu orders, all of the imperial officials and their wives attended her wake and mourned her. Later that year, with the realm suffering from a major drought, Empress Wu offered to be deposed which Emperor Gaozong rejected, so she remained his empress and continued to exercise power by "speaking to him" (like a co-ruler) or "on his behalf" (de facto regent). At her request, He further posthumously honored Wu Shiyue (who had previously been posthumously honored as the Duke of Zhou) and Lady Yang by giving them the titles of the Prince and Princess of Taiyuan.

==== Xianheng era (670–674) ====
In summer 670, the Tibetan Empire captured the 18 prefectures that Tang had established over the Western Regions (Xiyu), and Emperor Gaozong, in response, commissioned Xue Rengui, assisted by Ashina Daozhen (阿史那道真) and Guo Daifeng (郭待封), to attack the Qinghai Lake area, to try to open a second front against the Tibetan Empire as well as to try to restore the territory previously held by Tuyuhun. However, Guo, who felt himself to be Xue's equal as a general, was displeased at serving as an assistant, and their discord eventually led to a major defeat at the hands of the Tibetan Empire's prime minister Gar Trinring Tsendro. For the time being, the Xiyu territory was lost. By 672, Emperor Gaozong gave up the hopes of reestablishing Tuyuhun and moved Murong Nuohebo and his people deep into Tang territory.

By 674, Emperor Gaozong and Empress Wu was displeased at King Munmu of Silla encouragement of Goguryeo restoration movements who continued to resist Tang rule over the region and he stripped King Munmu of all Tang-bestowed titles, including the title of King of Silla, and arbitrarily conferred them on King Munmu's brother Kim Immun (金仁問) instead, commissioning Liu Rengui, assisted by Li Bi (李弼, Li Ji's brother) and the ethnically Mohe general Li Jinxing (李謹行), to escort Kim Immun back to Silla territory. However, King Munmu formally apologized and offered tribute, Emperor Gaozong and Empress Wu drawal and recalled Kim Immun.

The Sassanian prince Peroz III fled to China during this time around 670. The Chinese Emperor, who allowed Sassanian refugees fleeing from the Arab conquest to settle in China.

=== Late reign: Problems of succession ===
==== Shangyuan and Yifeng eras (674–679) ====
In 674, one of Empress Wu claims concerned the title and power of empress; arguing that the Emperor was called Son of Heaven (天子; Tiānzǐ), his wife should logically be called Empress of Heaven (天后; Tiānhòu). As a result, she linked her co-rule with divine right. Around the new year 675, Empress Wu submitted twelve suggestions. One was that the work of Laozi (whose family name was Li and to whom the Tang imperial clan traced its ancestry), Tao Te Ching, should be added to the required reading for imperial university students. Another was that a three-year mourning period should be observed for a mother's death in all cases, not only in those cases when the father was no longer alive. Moreover, degradation and rejection of flattering officials, allowing all officials to speak to the level of chancellors, promotion of competent mid-level officials, military expenses were reduced, taxes cut, salaries of deserving officials raised, retirees given a viable pension, and vast royal lands near the capital turned over to husbandry. Emperor Gaozong praised her for her suggestions and adopted them. In 675, Li Jinxing reached Silla territory with Mohe forces that submitted to Tang. However, Tang forces were repelled by Silla army at Maeso fortress.

The emperor over the years suffered much more severe headaches from consuming many of the dangerous substances that Empress Wu ordered. Because he could not run the empire, power in the imperial court gradually passed to Empress Wu. Meanwhile, by this time, even more Emperor Gaozong was continuously suffering from a persistent headache, and he considered making Empress Wu regent, to gain all power. Both Hao Chujun and Li Yiyan objected strenuously, and Emperor Gaozong did not make her regent, but until the end of his reign, she has decision-making power on most events in the governmental and border matters. Toward the end of Gaozong's life, Wu began engaging a number of mid-level officials who had literary talent, including Yuan Wanqing (元萬頃), Liu Yizhi, Fan Lübing, Miao Chuke (苗楚客), Zhou Simao (周思茂), and Han Chubin (韓楚賓), to write a number of works on her behalf, including the Biographies of Notable Women (列女傳), Guidelines for Imperial Subjects (臣軌), and New Teachings for Official Staff Members (百僚新誡). Collectively, they became known as the "North Gate Scholars" (北門學士), because they served inside the palace, which was to the north of the imperial government buildings, and Empress Wu sought advice from them to divert the powers of the chancellors: They thus act as a secret secretariat, "to process for the empress memorials addressed to the throne, and to make decisions on the policy which were properly the functions of the chancellors". (Note: The modern Chinese historian Bo Yang suggested that Emperor Gaozong's illnesses may be the result of long-term poisoning by Empress Wu, because of his long and debilitating illness, he often left his responsibilities to Empress Wu, or had to rely on her when himself wanted to address political issues, but did not provide evidence of how the poisoning took place.)

Also in 675, Li Hong the Crown Prince died suddenly—with traditional historians largely attributing his death to poisoning by Empress Wu, due to her anger that he tried to curb her power grab and had shown sympathy to his two older sisters born of Consort Xiao—Princesses Yiyang and Gao'an. Emperor Gaozong and Empress Wu, in grief, posthumously honored Li Hong as an emperor, and he created Empress Wu's second son, Li Xian the Prince of Yong, crown prince.

Along with the war with Silla, some resistance of Goguryeo people continued to plague Tang rule there. In 676, Xue Rengui crossed the Yellow Sea to fight against Silla. However, Silla navy expelled Tang forces on the coast of western Silla.

Emperor Gaozong and Empress Wu order withdrawal of Tang forces from the Korean Peninsula entirely and moved the Protectorate General to Pacify the East to Liaodong (遼東, in modern Liaoyang, Liaoning) and the commandant of Xiongjin (熊津), who governed the former Baekje territory at Sabi, to Geonan (建安, in modern Yingkou, Liaoning), allowing Silla eventually to expel Tang out of the Korean Peninsula and unified the parts of the peninsula south of the Taedong River.

In 677, he bestowed on Goguryeo's former King Bojang, Go Jang, the titles of Prince of Chaoxian and commandant of Liaodong, giving him the forcibly removed Goguryeo people. He also bestowed on Buyeo Yung the title of Prince of Daifang and commandant of Xiongjin—with the intent of letting Go Jang and Buyeo Yung to rebuild Goguryeo and Baekje as loyal vassals to counteract Silla. To accommodate these movements, the Protectorate General was further moved to Xincheng. (Note: Buyeo Yung was not able to make any headway in leading his people back to Baekje territory, while Go Jang tried to break away from Tang rule in alliance with the Mohe; when this was discovered, Emperor Gaozong and Empress Wu recalled him to Chang'an and exiled him to Qiong Prefecture.)

Meanwhile, Tang had to endure multiple attacks from the Tibetan Empire, and in 677, he commissioned Liu Rengui, then a chancellor, to take up defense position at Taohe Base (洮河軍, in modern Haidong Prefecture, Qinghai), to prepare a counterattack against the Tibetan Empire. However, Liu's proposals were repeatedly blocked by another chancellor, Li Jingxuan. In order to retaliate against Li Jingxuan, even though Liu knew that Li Jingxuan was not capable in military matters, he nevertheless recommended that Li Jingxuan take over for himself, and despite Li Jingxuan's attempt to decline, Emperor Gaozong commissioned Li Jingxuan to command the army against the Tibetan Empire. In fall 678, Li Jingxuan's forces engaged Tibetan forces commanded by Lun Qinling, and was soundly defeated, with Li Jingxuan's assistant Liu Shenli (劉審禮) captured by the Tibetan Empire. Li Jingxuan was only able to escape after being protected by the ethnically Baekje general Heichi Changzhi.

==== Tiaolu, Yonglong, Kaiyao, Yongchun, and Hongdao eras (679–683) ====
Meanwhile, the Western Turkic Khaganate chieftain Ashina Duzhi had claimed the title of Shixing Khan and was allied with another chieftain, Li Zhefu (李遮匐), and they pillaged Anxi (i.e., Suyab). Emperor Gaozong was ready to commission an army against Ashina Duzhi and Li Zhefu, but the official Pei Xingjian (裴行儉), who had previously served as secretary general at Xi Prefecture (西州, roughly modern Turfan Prefecture, Xinjiang), opposed—instead proposing that a small detachment be announced to escort the Persian prince Narsieh back to Persia to contend for regal title. Emperor Gaozong agreed and put Pei in charge of the detachment. When Pei arrived at Xi Prefecture, he, under the guise of a hunting party, summoned a number of tribal chiefs loyal to Tang in the area, and once they arrived, launched a surprise attack on Ashina Duzhi, who, caught by surprise, was forced to surrender; Li Zhefu then surrendered as well. (Narsieh, having been used in this manner, was left in the region to fend for himself.)

Meanwhile, though, another trouble was flaring up for Tang. The former Göktürk territory, over which Tang had established 24 prefectures with the tribal chiefs serving as prefects, rebelled, and, under the leadership of Ashide Wenfu (阿史德溫傅) and Ashide Fengzhi (阿史德奉職), supported Ashina Nishoufu as khan. Emperor Gaozong sent Xiao Siye to attack Ashina Nishoufu, but after Xiao achieved a few victories, he became careless, and a counterattack by Ashina Nishoufu crushed him, advancing as far as Ding Prefecture. Ashina Nishoufu also encouraged the Xi and the Khitan to attack Ying Prefecture (營州, roughly modern Zhaoyang, Liaoning), although those attacks were fought off. Around the new year 680, after Pei returned from the Western Turkic Khaganate front, Emperor Gaozong commissioned him to attack the Göktürks. Pei defeated and captured Ashide Fengzhi, and Ashina Nishoufu's subordinates killed him and surrendered, ending the rebellion.

Meanwhile, Li Xian's relationship with Empress Wu was deteriorating, as Li Xian heard rumors that he was not born of Empress Wu but her sister Lady of Han, and was fearful. Meanwhile, earlier, Ming Chongyan (明崇儼), a sorcerer trusted by Empress Wu and Emperor Gaozong, had repeatedly stated that he believed Li Xian did not have the abilities to be emperor, that his younger brother Li Zhe the Prince of Ying had an appearance like Emperor Taizong, and that another younger brother, Li Dan the Prince of Xiang, had the most honored appearance of all. Knowing that Li Xian was fearful of her, Empress Wu had the North Gate Scholars author teachings on filial piety to give to Li Xian, and also personally rebuked him, further causing him to be alarmed. When Ming was assassinated in 679, Empress Wu suspected Li Xian of carrying out the assassination. She had a report made to Emperor Gaozong that accused Li Xian of assassinating Ming. When the officials Xue Yuanchao, Pei Yan, and Gao Zhizhou were put in charge of investigations, they discovered a number of armors in Li Xian's palace. Empress Wu thus accused Li Xian of treason, and while Emperor Gaozong initially wanted to take no actions against Li Xian, at Empress Wu's insistence he relented. In fall 680, he with her advice reduced Li Xian to commoner rank, and created Li Zhe as the new crown prince.

In 681, the Göktürk territory flared up again, as the chieftain Ashina Fu'nian claimed khan title and allied with Ashide Wenfu to attack Chinese territory. Emperor Gaozong again commissioned Pei to attack Göktürk forces. Pei's assistant Cao Huaishun (曹懷舜) was initially defeated by Ashina Fu'nian, but after Pei sent spies to spread rumors, the rumors led to discord between Ashina Fu'nian and Ashide Wenfu. When Pei's forces approached Ashina Fu'nian's position, Ashina Fu'nian arrested Ashide Wenfu and surrendered. (Against Pei's recommendation to spare Ashina Fu'nian, Emperor Gaozong executed him.)

In 682, the Western Turkic Khaganate chieftain Ashina Chebo (阿史那車薄) rebelled against Tang rule, and Emperor Gaozong initially was to commission Pei again, but before the army could depart, Pei died. However, the commandant at Anxi, Wang Fangyi (王方翼, Empress Wang's cousin) was able to defeat Ashina Chebo and crush the rebellion.

Also in 682, the Göktürk chief Ashina Gudulu rose, in alliance with Ashide Yuanzhen (阿史德元珍), to claim khan title. This, unlike the several earlier rebellions, actually saw the Göktürk khanate being permanently reestablished to Tang's north and persisting for decades, and would plague the last two years of Emperor Gaozong's reign as well as the reigns of his successors.

Late in 683, Emperor Gaozong was seriously ill, and he, who was then at Luoyang, and only the Empress Wu were allowed to see her; the chancellors were not, and she attending to his; and at his direction (of course, she was in ruling power for many years), handling the all major affairs of state, and he at her request, summoned Li Zhe, then in charge of Chang'an, to Luoyang to meeted to him, so that at the time of his death he might sit on the throne. In November his illness led him to blindness. Imperial physician Qin Minghe (秦鳴鶴), hailing from the West/Daqin (now believed to be from Syria/Eastern Roman Empire) offered a cure of acupuncture and bloodletting, which was applied (and healed the blindness) despite Empress Wu's protests. Of course, he quickly became ill again, and his condition worsened. On 27 December 683, he died. At the time of his death, Empress Wu issued orders forbidding anyone from visiting him, which is why her enemies, and especially later historians, thought that she had killed the emperor.

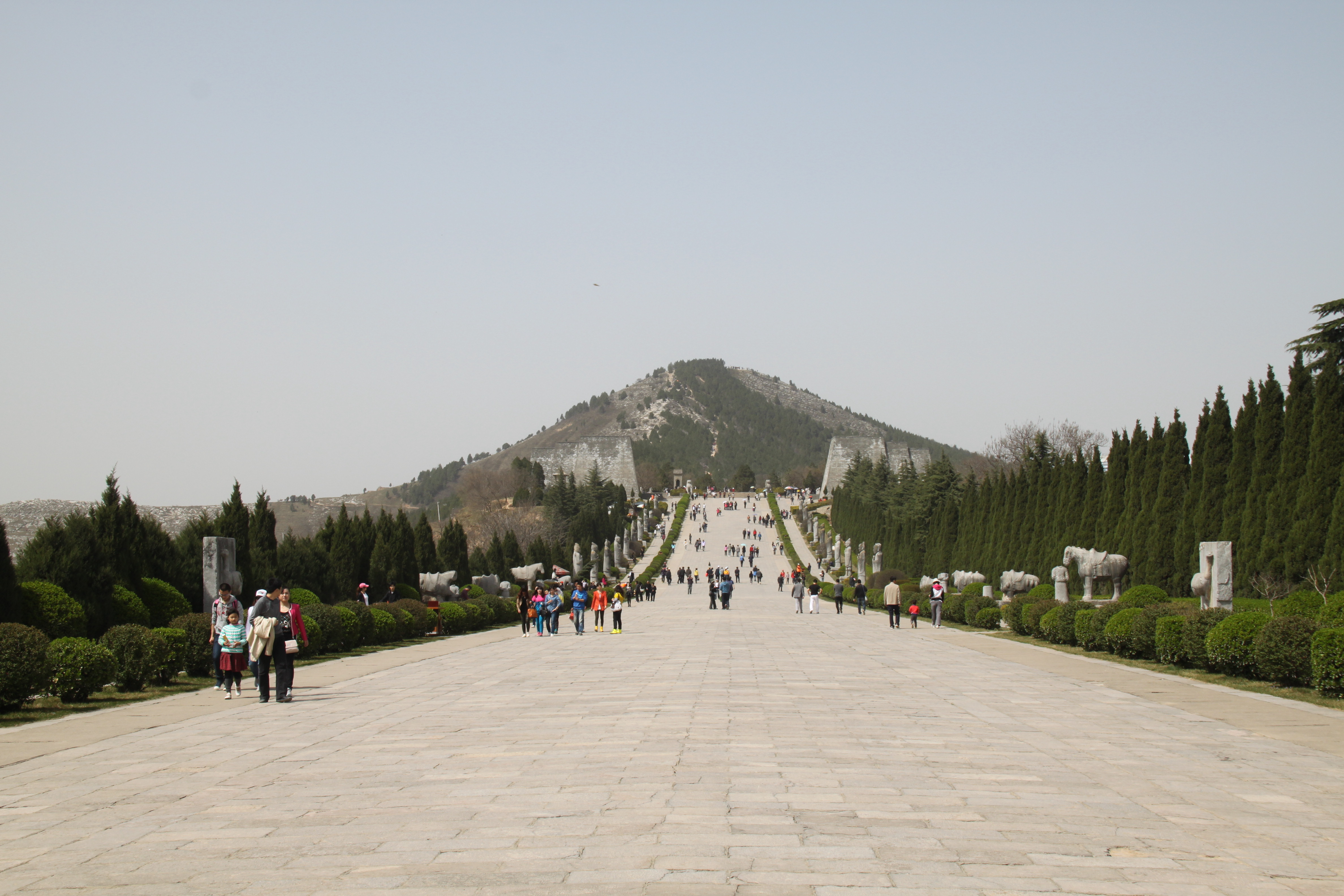
Qianling Mausoleum, Tomb of Emperor Tang Gaozong and Empress Wu Zetian

Li Zhe succeeded him (as Emperor Zhongzong), but all actual power still would be in the still hands of Empress Wu, who became empress dowager; Emperor Gaozong wrote a will that the Crown Prince Li Zhe should immediately seize the throne and that Empress Wu should act as regent (臨朝聽政制; linchao tingzheng Zhì; "Came to the court to listen and rule over the government"):

After 7 days, the Crown Prince will sit on the throne in front of my coffin. In the case of the tomb regime, austerity policies must be maintained. Every important issue should be discussed with the Empress of Heaven, and done by asking questions and determining her. If there is something in the army and government that can not be decided quickly, then the decision is the responsibility of the Empress of Heaven (天后权取; Tiānhòu Quán qǔ), and the emperor stops (停止皇帝权力; Tíngzhǐ Huángdì quánlì)!

== Hui Islamic legends ==
Known in Hui Islamic legends as Yung Wei, which was in fact the name of the first era in his reign (Yonghui era from February 650 to February 656; see era name), Islamic sources credit him with building the first mosque in China, the Huaisheng Mosque that still stands in Guangzhou.

== Era names ==
- Yonghui (永徽; yǒng huī) 649–656
- Xianqing (顯慶; xiǎn qìng) 656–661
- Longshuo (龍朔; lóng shuò) 661–663
- Linde (麟德; lín dé) 664–666
- Qianfeng (乾封; qián fēng) 666–668
- Zongzhang (總章; zǒng zhāng) 668–670
- Xianheng (咸亨; xián hēng) 670–674
- Shangyuan (上元; shàng yuán) 674–676
- Yifeng (儀鳳; yí fèng) 676–679
- Tiaolu (調露; tiáo lù) 679–680
- Yonglong (永隆; yǒng lóng) 680–681
- Kaiyao (開耀; kāi yào) 681–682
- Yongchun (永淳; yǒng chún) 682–683
- Hongdao (弘道; hóng dào) 683

== Chancellors during reign ==
- Zhangsun Wuji (649–659)
- Chu Suiliang (649–650, 652–655)
- Xu Jingzong (649–670)
- Gao Jifu (649–653)
- Zhang Xingcheng (649–653)
- Yu Zhining (649–659)
- Li Ji (649–669)
- Yuwen Jie (651–653)
- Liu Shi (651–654)
- Han Yuan (652–657)
- Lai Ji (652–657)
- Cui Dunli (653–656)
- Li Yifu (655–658, 662–663)
- Du Zhenglun (656–658)
- Xin Maojiang (658–659)
- Xu Yushi (659–662)
- Ren Yaxiang (659–662)
- Lu Chengqing (659–660)
- Shangguan Yi (662–664)
- Liu Xiangdao (664)
- Dou Dexuan (664–666)
- Le Yanwei (664–665)
- Sun Chuyue (664–665)
- Jiang Ke (665–672)
- Lu Dunxin (665–666)
- Liu Rengui (665–670, 672–683)
- Yang Hongwu (667–668)
- Dai Zhide (667–679)
- Li Anqi (667)
- Zhao Renben (667–670)
- Zhang Wenguan (667–678)
- Yan Liben (668–673)
- Li Jingxuan (669–670, 670–680)
- Hao Chujun (669–681)
- Lai Heng (676–678)
- Xue Yuanchao (676–683)
- Li Yiyan (676–683)
- Gao Zhizhou (676–679)
- Zhang Da'an (677–680)
- Wang Dezhen (680)
- Pei Yan (680–683)
- Cui Zhiwen (680–683)
- Guo Daiju (682–683)
- Cen Changqian (682–683)
- Guo Zhengyi (682–683)
- Wei Xuantong (682–683)
- Liu Jingxian (682–683)

== Family ==
- Empress, of the Wang clan of Taiyuan (皇后 太原王氏; 628–655)
- Empress Zetian, of the Wu clan (則天皇后 武氏 / 则天皇后; 624–705), personal name potentially originally Zhao (照), later changed to Zhao (曌/瞾) (Note: Her cousin's son Zong Qinke created a number of new characters in December 689, and she chose 曌 as her given name, which became her taboo name when she ascended the throne the next year. Some sources assert that this character was actually written 瞾. Some sources (e.g., Bo Yang Edition of the Zizhi Tongjian, vols. 47–49) also assert that her original given name was Zhao and that in 689 she only changed the written character, but this is confirmed by neither the Old Book of Tang nor the New Book of Tang, neither of which stated her original given name. Her grandson Li Chongzhao, sometime after she became emperor, changed his name to Li Chongrun to observe naming taboo for her, and the character of "Zhao" in Li Chongzhao's name was 照. See Old Book of Tang, vol. 86 and New Book of Tang, vol. 81.)
  - Li Hong, Yizong (義宗 李弘; 652–675), fifth son
  - Princess Si of Anding (安定思公主; 654), third daughter
  - Li Xián, Crown Prince Zhanghuai (章怀皇太子 李贤; 章懷皇太子 李賢; 655–684), sixth son
  - Li Xiǎn, Zhongzong (中宗 李显; 中宗 李顯; 656–710), seventh son
  - Li Dan, Ruizong (睿宗 李旦; 662–716), eighth son
  - Princess Taiping (太平公主; 665–713), personal name Lingyue (令月) (Note: Some scholars, interpreting a submission that her brother Li Zhe made while making a food offering to Emperor Gaozong and Empress Wu, written on his behalf by the official Cui Rong (崔融) and subsequently collected in the collection Full Tang Texts (全唐文), believed her name to be Li Lingyue (李令月), but the text cannot be conclusively interpreted in that manner. See [-http://www.dushu.com/showbook/100829/1025091.html Full Tang Texts], vol. 217.), fourth daughter
    - Married Xue Shao of Hedong, Viscount Pingyang (河东 薛绍; 河東 薛紹; d. 688) in 681, and had issue (two sons, two daughters)
    - Married Wu Youji, Prince of Ding (d. 712) in 690, and had issue (two sons, one daughter)
- Pure Consort, of the Xiao clan of Lanling (兰陵箫氏; 淑妃 / 蘭陵蕭氏; d. 27 November 655)
  - Grand Princess Jincheng (金城長公主; (c. 646–691), personal name Xiayu (下玉), first daughter
    - Married Quan Yi (权毅; 權毅; 647–691) in 671
  - Li Sujie, Prince of Xu (许王 李素节; 許王 李素節; 648–690), fourth son
  - Princess Gao'an (高安公主; 649–714), second daughter
    - Married Wang Xu (王勖; 王勗; d. 691) in 671, and had issue (three sons)
- Lady of Handsome Fairness, of the Xu clan (婕妤 徐氏), younger sister of Xu Hui
- Palace lady, of the Liu clan (刘氏; 宮人 劉氏; d. 665)
  - Li Zhong, Prince of Yan (燕王 李忠; 643–665), first son
- Palace lady, of the Zheng clan (郑氏; 宮人 鄭氏)
  - Li Xiao, Prince Dao of Yuan (原悼王 李孝; d. 664), second son
- Palace lady, of the Yang clan (宮人 杨氏; 宮人 楊氏; d. 667)
  - Li Shangjin, Prince of Ze (泽王 李上金; 澤王 李上金; 645–690), third son
- Lovers
  - Wu Shun, Madame of Han (韩国夫人; 韓國夫人), elder sister of Empress Wu
  - Lady Helan, Madame of Wei (魏国夫人; 魏國夫人), niece of Empress Wu

== In popular culture ==
- Portrayed by Yin Xiucen in the 1939 Chinese film The Empress Wu Tse-tien.
- Portrayed by Man Kok-Fei in the 1949 Chinese film Empress Wu Zetian.
- Portrayed by Zhao Lei in the 1963 Chinese film Empress Wu Tse-Tien.
- Portrayed by Yuan Baohua in the 1976 CTV TV series Wu Zetian.
- Portrayed by Lo Chun-shun in the 1984 ATV TV series Empress Wu.
- Portrayed by Fan Jih-hsing in the 1985-1986 CTV TV series The Empress of the Dynasty.
- Portrayed by Francis Ng in the 1986 TVB TV series General Father General Son.
- Portrayed by Cheung Ying-choi in the 1986 TVB TV series Destined to Rebel, in the 2003 TVB TV series Whatever It Takes.
- Portrayed by Hou Tianlai in the 1993 Chinese film The Imperial Nun.
- Portrayed by Zhao Jifeng and Tie Zheng in the 1994 TTV TV series New Sui and Tang Romance.
- Portrayed by Chen Baoguo in the 1995 CCTV TV series Wu Zetian.
- Portrayed by Wan Hongjie in the 1998 TV series Tragic Love in the Tang Dynasty.
- Portrayed by Li Zhiyu in the 2000 CCTV-8 TV series Palace of Desire.
- Portrayed by Ma Ke and Huo Yaming in the 2001 TV series Love Legend of the Tang Dynasty.
- Portrayed by Ji Chenmu in the 2002 FTV TV series Fan Lihua.
- Portrayed by Bao Jianfeng in the 2003 CTS TV series Lady Wu: The First Empress.
- Portrayed by Zhang Tielin in the 2006 CDTV-4/TVS2 TV series Wu Zi Bei Ge.
- Portrayed by Xiding Min in the 2006 TV series The Legend of Xue Rengui.
- Portrayed by Hu Wenbao in the 2006 BTV TV series The Rise of the Tang Empire.
- Portrayed by Han Beom Hee in the 2006-2007 KBS1 TV series Dae Jo-yeong.
- Portrayed by Park Jun-hyuk in the 2006-2007 SBS TV series Yeon Gaesomun.
- Portrayed by Ma Yuke in the 2007 CCTV-1 TV series Carol of Zhenguan.
- Portrayed by Zhiqi Fan in the 2007 TV series The Scholar-General of the Great Tang: Sacred King, Founder of Zhangzhou.
- Portrayed by Ma Xiaowei in the 2007-2008 CCTV TV series The Shadow of Empress Wu.
- Portrayed by Wang Yong Qiang in the 2009 documentary drama Legend of The Tang Empire.
- Portrayed by Ding Zhengyong in the 2010 CCTV-8 TV series Detective Di Renjie Prequel.
- Portrayed by Zheng Guolin in the 2011 GZBN TV series Beauty World.
- Portrayed by Yu Shaoqun and Winston Chao in the 2011 HBS TV series Secret History of Empress Wu.
- Portrayed by Gao Ziqi in the 2011 HBS TV series Secret History of Princess Taiping.
- Portrayed by Matthew Ko in the 2012 TVB TV series House of Harmony and Vengeance.
- Portrayed by Yueli Yue in the 2012 SETV/Shenzhen TV TV series Legend of Fan Liwa.
- Portrayed by Seo Dong-soo in the 2012-2013 KBS TV series Dream of the Emperor.
- Portrayed by Patrick Tam in the 2013 Hunan TV TV series Dream Back to Tang Dynasty.
- Portrayed by Wang Renjun in the 2013 SRT TV series Xue Ding Shan.
- Portrayed by Sheng Chien in the 2013 Chinese film Young Detective Dee: Rise of the Sea Dragon, in the 2018 Chinese film Detective Dee: The Four Heavenly Kings.
- Portrayed by Yang Lu in the 2013 Le.com TV series Man Comes to Tang Dynasty.
- Portrayed by Chiu Hsin-Chih in the 2013-2014 TV series Shang Guan Wan Er.
- Portrayed by Zheng Siren in the 2014 Hunan TV TV series Heroes of Sui and Tang Dynasties.
- Portrayed by Yuan Hong in the 2014 ZJTV TV series Young Sherlock.
- Portrayed by Aarif Rahman in the 2014-2015 Hunan TV TV series The Empress of China.
- Portrayed by Yu Rongguang in the 2015 HBS TV series Heroes of Sui and Tang Dynasties 5.
- Portrayed by Lee Byung-chul in the 2017 KBS1 TV series Chronicles of Korea.
- Portrayed by Aohui Qu in the 2017 BRTV/AHTV TV series Detective Dee.
- Portrayed by Zhang Bo Nan in the 2018 Chinese film Di Renjie: Under the Tower.
- Portrayed by Junior Han in the 2018 FTV TV series Great Times.
- Portrayed by Shunran Zhao in the 2021 Hunan TV TV series Weaving a Tale of Love.
- Portrayed by Liu Duan Duan in the 2024 CCTV-8 TV series Judge Dee's Mystery.
- Portrayed by Park Kang-sub in the 2026 KBS2 TV series Sword & Silence.
- Portrayed by Darren Chen in the 2026 Chinese mobile game interactive film Road to Empress Ⅱ.

== See also ==
- Chinese emperors family tree (middle)

== Sources ==
- Old Book of Tang, vols. 4, 5.
- New Book of Tang, vol. 3.
- Zizhi Tongjian (in Chinese). Vol. 195, 199, 200, 201, 202, 203, 204, 205, 206, 207, 208. 1084.

Emperor Gaozong of Tang House of Li Born: 21 July 628 Died: 27 December 683
Regnal titles
| Preceded by Emperor Taizong of Tang | Emperor of China; Tang; 649–683 with Zhangsun Wuji (649–659); Chu Suiliang (649–658); Empress Wu (660–683) | Succeeded by Emperor Zhongzong of Tang |
