= Grand Princess Jincheng =

Tang dynasty princess (c. 643–691)

Li Xiayu
- Grand Princess Jincheng
- Born: c. 643; Longxi Chengji (modern-day Qin'an County, Gansu, China)
- Died: 691
- Burial: 705; Qianling Mausoleum
- Spouse: Quan Yi
- Father: Emperor Gaozong of Tang
- Mother: Pure Consort Xiao

Grand Princess Jincheng (c. 646–691), personal name Li Xiayu (李下玉), was a princess of Tang dynasty. She held the title Princess Yiyang during her lifetime, and was posthumously honored with the title Grand Princess Jincheng in 705. She was the eldest daughter of Emperor Gaozong of Tang and Pure Consort Xiao.

== Early life ==
Princess Yiyang was born between 643 and 646 in Chengji, Longxi as the eldest daughter of Emperor Gaozong of Tang and Pure Consort Xiao.

In 655 her mother, Consort Xiao, was executed after losing favor to Empress Wu Zetian. Princess Yiyang and her younger sister, Princess Gao'an, were thereafter imprisoned in Yeting Palace.

== Married life ==
In 671, Crown Prince Li Hong requested that Emperor Gaozong arrange marriages for Princess Yiyang and Princess Xuancheng, which the emperor approved. Wu Zetian, however, was displeased and arranged for Princess Yiyang to marry Quan Yi, a guard of the Shangyi Army. In the Tang dynasty, palace guards were not ordinary soldiers; only sons of nobles could hold such positions. Quan Yi came from a prestigious family. His great-grandfather and great-great-grandfather were high-ranking officials in the Northern Zhou and Sui dynasties, his grandfather was a subordinate of Emperor Gaozong's father and was posthumously honored as Duke of Lu, and his father had served as a regional high-ranking official.

Following their marriage, Quan Yi was appointed to various regional positions, including Zuo Guoyi of Qichuan Prefecture and later Governor of Yuanzhou. Wu Zetian ordered Princess Yiyang to accompany her husband to his postings, preventing her from residing in the capital. In 681, Quan Yi received a promotion as part of an imperial initiative, yet he and Princess Yiyang were still not permitted to return to Chang’an. She was only allowed back in 683 to attend her father’s funeral.

In 691, Quan Yi was executed after offending Wu Zetian.

== Death and burial ==
In 691, shortly after her husband's death, Princess Yiyang died. In 705, following the Shenlong Coup, Emperor Zhongzong reinstated the Li Tang dynasty and posthumously honored Quan Yi as General of the Right Guard Gate and Princess Yiyang as Grand Princess Jincheng. In 709, she and Quan Yi were reburied in Qianling Mausoleum.
