= Gao Zhizhou =

Chinese politician of the Tang dynasty (602–683)

Gao Zhizhou (高智周; 602–683) was a Chinese politician of the Tang dynasty, serving as chancellor during the reign of Emperor Gaozong.

Gao Zhizhou was born in 602, during the reign of Emperor Wen of Sui, the founding emperor of Tang's predecessor Sui dynasty. His family was from what would become Chang Prefecture (常州, roughly modern Changzhou, Jiangsu). He was said to have been studious in his youth and, after passing the imperial examination, served as the county magistrate of Fei County (費縣, in modern Linyi, Shandong). As his salary was higher than those of the sheriff and the secretary general of the county, he shared his salary evenly with them. He was also said to be a capable county magistrate, and the people and subordinate officials carved a stone monument in his honor. Eventually, during the reign of Emperor Gaozong, he was made an imperial scholar and participated in the creation of the literary works Yaoshan Yucai (瑤山玉彩) and Wenguan Cilin (文館辭林), headed by Emperor Gaozong's crown prince Li Hong. Further, he and two other officials, He Kai (賀凱) and Wang Zhenru (王真儒), assisted in Li Hong's studies. In 668, he took a vacation home to bury his parents, and when he reached home, he commented to his relatives, "Knowing how to advance but not how to retreat is the way to disaster." He thereafter, claiming an illness, resigned.

Gao was subsequently recalled to serve as the prefect of Shou Prefecture (壽州, roughly modern Lu'an, Anhui). He was said to be gracious and forgiving in his rule, and the people appreciated it. Whenever he went out to visit the towns, he would first summon the local teachers and students to see how the students were doing in their studies and their understanding of current affairs, before he would move on to the matters of agriculture and law. In 671, he was recalled to the central government to serve as imperial consultant and acting deputy minister of ceremonies. In 676, he was serving as Huangmen Shilang (黃門侍郎), the deputy head of the examination bureau of government (門下省, Menxia Sheng), when he was given the designation Tong Zhongshu Menxia Sanpin (同中書門下三品), making him a chancellor de facto. He was also in charge of editing imperial histories. In 677, he was also made a member of the staff of Li Hong's younger brother Li Xian, now crown prince after Li Hong's death in 675. In 679, however, he became imperial censor and was no longer chancellor. In 680, when Li Xian, who had by now lost the favor of Emperor Gaozong's powerful wife Empress Wu (later known as Wu Zetian), was accused of plotting treason, Gao, along with the chancellors Xue Yuanchao and Pei Yan, were in charge of the investigations, and Li Xian was found guilty, deposed, and exiled. Gao, by this point, had repeatedly requested to retire, and Emperor Gaozong granted the retirement request. He died in 683 and was given posthumous honors and the posthumous name Ding (定, "considerate").
