= Guo Daiju =

Guo Daiju (郭待舉) was a Chinese politician during the Tang dynasty, serving as a chancellor during the reign of Emperor Gaozong as well as the regency of Emperor Gaozong's wife Empress Wu (later known as Wu Zetian) over their sons Emperor Zhongzong and Emperor Ruizong.

Despite Guo's high status, little is firmly established about his background or career except for the years that he served as chancellor—as, unusual for a chancellor, he did not have a biography in either the Old Book of Tang or the New Book of Tang. He was from Yingchuan (潁川, in modern Xuchang, Henan.) According to the table of chancellors in the New Book of Tang, his father was Guo Chufan (郭處範), who at one point served as the secretary general of Zhucheng County (諸城, in modern Weifang, Shandong).

As of 682, late in the reign of Emperor Gaozong, Guo was Huangmen Shilang (黃門侍郎), the deputy head of the examination bureau of government (門下省, Menxia Sheng), when he was given the designation Tong Zhongshu Menxia Pingchangshi (同中書門下平章事), making him a chancellor de facto. However, nothing was recorded about his acts as chancellor, and the next reference to him was in 684, by which time Emperor Gaozong had died and been succeeded by his son Emperor Zhongzong—who was then deposed by Empress Wu, then empress dowager and regent, for disobeying her—and then by Emperor Zhongzong's brother Emperor Ruizong. In 684, there had been a rebellion by Li Jingye the Duke of Ying against Empress Dowager Wu's rule, and while Li Jingye's rebellion was quickly defeated, the chancellor Pei Yan was executed on suspicion that he sympathized with Li Jingye's rebellion. After Pei's death, there were a series of official movements involving officials who had tried to defend Pei, and as part of these movements, Guo was stripped of his status as chancellor and made a member of the staff of Emperor Ruizong's crown prince Li Chengqi, but just a month later, he was further demoted to the post of prefect of Yue Prefecture (岳州, roughly modern Yueyang, Henan). Nothing further about him was recorded in history, although the table of chancellors in the New Book of Tang indicated his grandsons Guo Run (郭潤) and Guo Na (郭納) later served as imperial officials.
