= Zhang Da'an =

Zhang Da'an (張大安) (died 684) was an official of the Chinese Tang dynasty, serving as a chancellor during the reign of Emperor Gaozong.

Zhang Da'an was one of the sons of Zhang Gongjin (張公謹), a key follower of Li Shimin (the eventual Emperor Taizong) the Prince of Qin, a son and major general of Tang's founder Emperor Gaozu, who supported Li Shimin in his rivalry with his brother Li Jiancheng the Crown Prince. When Li Shimin feared that Li Jiancheng was about to kill him in 626, Zhang Gongjin was a major proponent of launching a preemptive strike against Li Jiancheng and another brother who supported Li Jiancheng, Li Yuanji the Prince of Qi, and when Li Shimin did so (in an incident known as the Incident at Xuanwu Gate), Zhang defended Li Shimin's mansion against counterattacks by Li Jiancheng's and Li Yuanji's followers after Li Shimin killed Li Jiancheng and Li Yuanji. Zhang Gongjin died in 632 at the age of 38 and was eventually posthumously created the Duke of Tan and honored in one of the Portraits at Lingyan Pavilion, reserved for the greatest contributors to Emperor Taizong's reign.

It is not known when Zhang Da'an himself was born, but it is known that he had at least two older brothers, Zhang Daxiang (張大象) and Zhang Dasu (張大素). Less is known about Zhang Da'an's career than his father's. By 677, he was serving on the staff of Li Xian, the crown prince of Emperor Gaozong (Emperor Taizong's son), when he was given the designation Tong Zhongshu Menxia Sanpin (同中書門下三品), making him a chancellor de facto. He and another staff member, Liu Nayan (劉訥言), were key contributors in a project led by Li Xian in writing commentaries for the Book of Later Han, the official history of the Eastern Han dynasty. In 680, Li Xian, who had lost the favor of Emperor Gaozong's powerful wife and his mother Empress Wu (later known as Wu Zetian), was accused of plotting treason, deposed, and exiled. Most of the staff members were pardoned, but Liu was exiled, and Zhang was also accused of flattering the former crown prince and demoted to the post of Pu Prefecture (普州, roughly modern Ziyang, Sichuan). He died in 684, while serving as the military advisor to the prefect of Heng Prefecture (橫州, roughly modern Nanning, Guangxi).
