= Pei Yan =

Pei Yan (Chinese: 裴炎; died November 30, 684), courtesy name Zilong (子隆), posthumous name Zhong (忠), was a Chinese politician of the Tang dynasty, serving as a chancellor during the reign of Emperor Gaozong, as well as the regency of his wife Empress Wu over their sons Emperor Zhongzong and Emperor Ruizong. Pei was well trusted by Emperor Gaozong and Empress Wu late in Emperor Gaozong's reign, but drew Empress Wu's ire after he advised her, who was then empress dowager, to end her regency and return power to Emperor Ruizong. In 684, she accused him of treason and executed him.

== Background ==
Pei Yan was from Jiang Prefecture (絳州, part of modern Yuncheng, Shanxi), and it is not known when he was born. When he was young, he became a student at the imperial university, and it was said that during vacations, the other students would often go out to travel, but Pei kept studying. After he studied at the university for more than a year, he was due to be recommended for an official post, but he declined the recommendation on the basis that he felt that his studies were not done, and he ended up studying for more than 10 years at the university, particularly gaining expertise in the Zuo Zhuan and the Book of Han.

== During Emperor Gaozong's reign ==
At some point, Pei Yan passed the imperial examination, and he was made the food storage officer at Pu Prefecture (濮州, roughly modern Heze, Shandong). He eventually served successively as assistant imperial censor, imperial archivist, deputy minister of defense, and eventually Huangmen Shilang (黃門侍郎): deputy head of the examination bureau of government (門下省, Menxia Sheng). In 680, he was given the designation of Tong Zhongshu Menxia Sanpin (同中書門下三品), making him a chancellor de facto. Later that year, when Emperor Gaozong's crown prince Li Xian was accused of treason, Emperor Gaozong had him, Xue Yuanchao, and Gao Zhizhou investigate. Eventually, Li Xián was deposed and replaced by his brother Li Zhe.

In 681, Pei Yan became Shizhong (侍中), the head of the examination bureau and a post considered one for a chancellor. Later that year, he was involved in a dispute with the general Pei Xingjian (裴行儉), as Pei Xingjian had earlier that year defeated the Celestial Turk chief Ashina Fu'nian (阿史那伏念) and induced Ashina Fu'nian to first capture his confederate Ashide Wenbo (阿史德溫博) and then surrender, promising Ashina Fu'nian that he would be spared if he did so. However, Pei Yan was said to be jealous of Pei Xingjian, and he reported that Ashina Fu'nian was only forced to surrender due to military pressure by Pei Xingjian's deputies Zhang Qianxu (張虔勗) and Cheng Wuting (程務挺), advocating that Ashina Fu'nian should be put to death. Emperor Gaozong agreed and executed Ashina Fu'nian, causing Pei Xingjian to be distressed, and Pei Xingjian retired, claiming illness.

In 682, due to a famine in the Guanzhong region (i.e., the region around the capital Chang'an), Emperor Gaozong left Chang'an and took up residence at the eastern capital Luoyang, leaving Li Zhe in charge at Chang'an, assisted by Pei Yan and his fellow chancellors Liu Rengui and Xue Yuanchao. In 683, when Emperor Gaozong became ill, he summoned Li Zhe to Luoyang, accompanied by Pei, and when Emperor Gaozong's illness became even more serious, he formally put Li Zhe in charge of important state matters, assisted by Pei, Liu Jingxian, and Guo Zhengyi. Around the new year 684, Emperor Gaozong died, and formally on Pei's suggestion, Emperor Gaozong's powerful wife Empress Wu (later known as Wu Zetian), now empress dowager, took regent powers until a formal enthronement of Li Zhe (as Emperor Zhongzong). She made Pei Zhongshu Ling (中書令), the head of the legislative bureau of government (中書省, Zhongshu Sheng). (The office of the chancellors, Zhengshi Tang (政事堂), was prior to this event located in the examination bureau. When Pei became Zhongshu Ling, he moved it to the legislative bureau, where it would remain from that point on.)

== During Empress Dowager Wu's regency ==
In spring 684, Emperor Zhongzong, despite Empress Dowager Wu's regency, attempted to assert some key personnel decisions of his own—trying to make his father-in-law Wei Xuanzhen (韋玄貞, the father of his wife Empress Wei) Shizhong, and also trying to give an office of the fifth rank (within the nine-rank Tang governmental structure) to his wet nurse's son. Pei opposed both commissions, and Emperor Zhongzong, in frustration, stated, "What would be wrong even if I give the empire to Wei Xuanzhen? Why do you care that he is made Shizhong?" Concerned, Pei reported this to Empress Dowager Wu. She, in response, ordered Pei and fellow chancellor Liu Yizhi, as well as the generals Cheng Wuting and Zhang Qianxu, lead troops into the palace, and then issued an edict deposing Emperor Zhongzong and demoting him to the title of Prince of Luling, replacing him with his younger brother Li Dan the Prince of Yu (as Emperor Ruizong). She, however, held onto all imperial power as regent, and Emperor Ruizong had no real power. For his contributions in this matter, Pei was given a noble title.

However, Pei would soon begin to run afoul of Empress Dowager Wu. Later in 684, pursuant to suggestions by her nephew Wu Chengsi, Empress Dowager Wu planned to posthumously honor her ancestors princes, and also build seven ancestral temples for them—a highly sensitive move, in that regulations allowed only the emperor to build seven ancestral temples, while any noble family, no matter how honored, was restricted to no more than five temples. Pei argued against the move, specifically comparing Empress Dowager Wu's actions to those of Emperor Gao of Han's wife Empress Lü Zhi (whose clan was powerful in her lifetime as empress dowager but was slaughtered after her death), to no avail, and she began to view him negatively from that point on. Their conflict became worsened later that year, as Empress Dowager Wu, listening to Wu Chengsi's advice, began considering seizing the throne herself with the title of "emperor." She, Wu Chengsi, and another powerful nephew Wu Sansi were all concerned about the high esteem the people held for Emperor Ruizong's granduncles Li Yuanjia (李元嘉) the Prince of Han and Li Lingkui (李靈夔) the Prince of Lu, and Wu Chengsi suggested that she find excuses to have them executed. When Empress Dowager Wu consulted the chancellors, both Liu Yizhi and Wei Siqian were fearful and therefore did not dare to speak, but Pei strenuously objected, making her even more angry at him.

Also late in 684, Li Jingye the Duke of Ying (the grandson of the great general Li Shiji) rebelled, citing as his agenda his desire to restore power to Emperor Ruizong. One of Li Jingye's key coconspirators was Pei's nephew Xue Zhongzhang (薛仲璋), which drew Empress Dowager Wu's suspicion. Meanwhile, Pei, in order to try to show that the rebellion was nothing to worry about, was intentionally slow in dispatching troops to suppress the rebellion. He further told Empress Dowager Wu that if she returned authorities to Emperor Ruizong, the rebellion would, for the lack of a good point of propaganda, collapse on its own. Empress Dowager Wu became more suspicious, and when the official Cui Cha (崔詧) heard this, he submitted a petition accusing Pei of treason. Empress Dowager Wu had Pei arrested and had him interrogated by the imperial censors Qian Weidao (騫味道) and Yu Chengye (魚承曄). Pei, even while under interrogation, did not humble himself before his interrogators, and when someone encouraged him to be humbler, he responded, "Once a chancellor is arrested, how can he still survive?"

Meanwhile, a number of Pei's colleagues were trying to save him. In particular, Liu Jingxian and another high-level official, Hu Yuanfan (胡元範) particularly tried to guarantee that Pei was not treasonous. She did not listen, and Pei was executed later that year. (As a result, for their attempts to save Pei, Hu was exiled and died at his place of exile; Liu Jingxian was also exiled and eventually executed; Cheng Wuting was also executed; and Guo Daiju was demoted.) It was said that when Pei was due to be executed, he looked at his brothers, who were due to be exiled themselves, and sighed, "My brothers, you all became officials out of your own merit, not because I helped you. Alas, now on my account you are being exiled to the boundaries of the empire." When Pei's assets were due to be seized, it was discovered that he had no savings at all. Eventually, only after Empress Dowager Wu's death in 705 (after she had, indeed, taking "emperor" title in 690) and after Emperor Ruizong again became emperor in 710 was Pei posthumously honored and given the posthumous name of Zhong (忠, "faithful").

== Notes and references ==
- Old Book of Tang, vol. 87.
- New Book of Tang, vol. 117.
- Zizhi Tongjian, vols. 202, 203.
