= Xue Yuanchao =

Chinese politician of the Tang dynasty

Xue Yuanchao (Chinese: 薛元超; 622–683), formal name Xue Zhen (薛振) but went by the courtesy name of Yuanchao, formally Baron of Fenyin (汾陰男), was a Chinese politician of the Chinese Tang dynasty who served as a chancellor during the reign of Emperor Gaozong.

== Background ==
Xue Yuanchao was born in 622. His family was from what would eventually become Pu Prefecture (蒲州, roughly modern Yuncheng, Shanxi). His grandfather Xue Daoheng (薛道衡) was a high-level official of Sui dynasty before being executed in 609 due to jealousy that Emperor Yang of Sui had for his literary talent, and as a result, Xue Yuanchao's father Xue Shou (薛收) declined to serve under Sui dynasty, and eventually joined the rebellion by the general Li Yuan in 617, serving under Li Yuan's son Li Shimin. After Li Yuan founded Tang dynasty in 618 as its Emperor Gaozu, Xue Shou continued to serve Li Shimin as a secretary and advisor, but died fairly early in 624, still during Emperor Gaozu's reign at age 32. He was bestowed various honors in 633, after Li Shimin became emperor in 626 (as Emperor Taizong).

Xue Yuanchao inherited the title Baron of Fenyin in 630, which Xue Shou had been created for his contributions in the campaign against Liu Heita. When he grew older, he became known for his studiousness and writing ability. Emperor Taizong was impressed by him, and had him marry Lady Hejing, the daughter of Emperor Taizong's brother Li Yuanji. He was made an attendant to Emperor Taizong's crown prince Li Zhi, and participated in drafting the official history of Jin dynasty, the Book of Jin.

== During Emperor Gaozong's reign ==
After Emperor Taizong died in 649, Li Zhi took the throne (as Emperor Gaozong). He made Xue Yuanchao an imperial attendant. He often submitted suggestions to Emperor Gaozong as to proper relations with his subject officials and the various current affairs, and Emperor Gaozong was impressed by them. He was soon made a mid-level official at the legislative bureau of government (中書省, Zhongshu Sheng) and an imperial scholar, continuing to be in charge of writing imperial histories. It was said that the legislative bureau had a large flat rock that Xue Yuanchao's grandfather Xue Daoheng had often used as a table on which to draft various regulations, and whenever Xue Yuanchao saw it, he would shed tears for his grandfather.

In 654, on account of his mother's death, Xue Yuanchao left governmental service to observe a period of mourning. In 655, he returned to governmental service as Huangmen Shilang (黃門侍郎), the deputy head of the examination bureau of government (門下省, Menxia Sheng), as well as a staff member for Emperor Gaozong's crown prince Li Zhong. By this point, Xue was known not only for his literary talent, but his ability to find capable people and recommend them for government service. Among the people he recommended were later key officials Ren Xigu (任希古), Gao Zhizhou, Guo Zhengyi, Wang Yifang (王義方), and Meng Lizhen (孟利貞). Later, though, he was sent out of the capital Chang'an to serve as the prefect of Rao Prefecture (饒州, roughly modern Shangrao, Jiangxi), on account of illness.

In 658 or 663, he became Dong Tai Shilang (東臺侍郎), the deputy head of the legislative bureau, which by this time was renamed Dong Tai (東臺). In 663, the chancellor Li Yifu was removed from office and exiled to Xi Prefecture (巂州, roughly modern Liangshan Yi Autonomous Prefecture, Sichuan), and according to regulations, exiles were not allowed to ride horses on the way to the place of exile. Xue made a request that Li be given a horse, and offended the emperor in doing so and was demoted to be the prefect of Jian Prefecture (簡州, roughly modern Ziyang, Sichuan). In 664, another chancellor, Shangguan Yi, was executed for opposing Emperor Gaozong's powerful wife Empress Wu (later known as Wu Zetian), and as Xue often exchanged correspondences with Shangguan, Xue was himself removed from office and exiled to Xi Prefecture.

Early in Emperor Gaozong's Shangyuan era (674-676), there was a general pardon, and Xue was allowed to return to Chang'an and was made an imperial advisor with the examination bureau. In 676, he became Zhongshu Shilang (中書侍郎), the deputy head of the legislative bureau, which by this time had changed its name back to Zhongshu Sheng, and later that year he received the designation Tong Zhongshu Menxia Sanpin (同中書門下三品), making him a chancellor de facto. Also that year, he was commissioned by Emperor Gaozong to go on a tour of the Hebei Circuit (河北道, roughly modern Hebei) to examine the prefects in the circuit. Around that time, there was an occasion when Emperor Gaozong was on a hunt when he had non-Han tribal chiefs attend the hunt, armed with weapons. Xue submitted a secret petition advising against it on the account of dangerousness, and Emperor Gaozong was touched by the concern he showed. From that point on, he often invited Xue to share meals with him and the imperial princes. Emperor Gaozong, impressed with Xue's talent in governance, also made the comment to him, "Given that you are at Zhongshu Sheng, I do not need a large number of people there." In 680, when Emperor Gaozong's then-crown prince Li Xian was accused of treason, Emperor Gaozong put Xue, along with Pei Yan and Gao Zhizhou, in charge of the investigations, after which Li Xian was deposed and replaced with his brother Li Zhe.

In 681, Xue was made Zhongshu Ling (中書令) —the head of the legislative bureau and a post considered one for a chancellor—as well as a member of Li Xián's staff. In 682, when there was a major famine in the Guanzhong region (i.e., the Chang'an region), Emperor Gaozong left Chang'an to take up residence at the eastern capital Luoyang, and he left Li Zhe in charge of the capital, assisted by Xue and fellow chancellors Liu Rengui and Pei. Emperor Gaozong told Xue that Li Zhe was still young and needed counsel. Xue thereafter recommended a number of officials, including the later important officials Zheng Zuxuan (鄭祖玄), Deng Xuanting (鄧玄挺), and Cui Rong (崔融) to be resident scholars at Li Zhe's palace, and he often submitted advice to Li Zhe, counseling him against frequently spending time in hunting. Emperor Gaozong heard of this and awarded him with silk, and then summoned him to Luoyang.

In 683, Xue suffered a throat illness that rendered him unable to speak, and he offered to retire. Emperor Gaozong allowed him to retire, and bestowed on him the honorific title Jinzi Guanglu Daifu (金紫光祿大夫). He died in winter 683—around the same time that Emperor Gaozong himself died—and was buried with honors, near the tomb of Emperor Gaozong.

== Notes and references ==
- Old Book of Tang, vol. 73.
- New Book of Tang, vol. 98.
- Zizhi Tongjian, vols. 202, 203.
