= Li Jingxuan =

Chinese military general of Tang China

Li Jingxuan (李敬玄; 615–682), formally Duke Wenxian of Zhao (趙文憲公), was a Chinese military general of Tang China, serving as chancellor of the Tang dynasty during the reign of Emperor Gaozong. He was famed for his efficient organization of the civil service system. In 678, over his objections, he was put in command of an army against the Tibetan Empire and was defeated. He was removed from his post soon after, and although he returned to imperial service, he never regained his former power.

== Background ==
Li Jingxuan was born in 615, late in the reign of Emperor Yang of Sui. His family was from what would become Bo Prefecture (亳州, roughly modern Bozhou, Anhui). His father Li Xiaojie (李孝節) served as the secretary general of Gu Prefecture (穀州, part of modern Luoyang, Henan) during Sui's succeeding dynasty Tang dynasty.

Li Jingxuan was said to be studious in his youth, and was particularly well-studied in various traditional ceremonies. Late in the reign of Emperor Taizong, the chancellor Ma Zhou, knowing Li Jingxuan's talent, recommended him to be a resident scholar to study with Emperor Taizong's crown prince Li Zhi. He was allowed to study books in the imperial collection of books. It was said that Li Jingxuan appeared stern and arrogant, but was diligent in his duties. Both Ma and another official, Xu Jingzong, endorsed Li Jingxuan for his abilities.

== During Emperor Gaozong's reign ==
In 649, Emperor Taizong, and Li Zhi took the throne (as Emperor Gaozong). Li Jingxuan's activities during the earliest years of Emperor Gaozong's reign are not clear, but as of the early part of Emperor Gaozong's Qianfeng era (666-668), he was serving as a mid-level official at the legislative bureau of government (西臺, Xi Tai), as well as an imperial scholar. In 669, he was promoted to the post of Xi Tai Shilang (西臺侍郎) -- the deputy head of the legislative bureau; he also carried additional titles as a staff member for Emperor Gaozong's crown prince Li Hong and acting deputy minister of civil service. He also received the designation of Tong Dong Xi Tai Sanpin (同東西臺三品), making him a chancellor de facto. He would serve as a chancellor for a decade, with his service only interrupted by his observance of a parent's (unclear which one) death in 670.

It was said that one of Li's assistants, Zhang Renhui (張仁褘), was capable, and Li entrusted him to draft civil service regulations and forms, which Zhang did with skill. Zhang, however, overworked himself and died early from exhaustion. Li adopted the regulations and forms that Zhang drafted, and was able to make the civil service system more efficient than before, and it was said that since the start of Emperor Gaozong's reign, many officials had been in charge of civil service, but few were good at their duties, with Li being an exception and praised for his abilities. The reserve officials who visit Chang'an to request positions number in the thousands each year, and it was said that Li was capable of remembering their names and their strengths and weaknesses. The people were impressed with his memory and did not dare to deceive him. One particular example cited in by historians was one Xu Taixuan (徐太玄). Xu had, while serving as a prefectural official, encountered the situation where his colleague Zhang Hui (張惠) was due to be executed for receiving bribes. Xu knew that Zhang had an old mother, and therefore told the investigator that some of the bribes were his—thus decreasing the amount that Zhang was responsible for and causing him to be spared from death, but because of this, Xu was stuck at his position and not promoted for more than a decade. Li found out about this and was impressed with Xu's character, and so promoted him, earning Li praise for being a good judge of character when Xu eventually served with distinction. In 675, Li was formally made the minister of civil service and continued to serve as chancellor as well. In 676, Li was made Zhongshu Ling (中書令) -- the head of the legislative bureau, which by this time was renamed Zhongshu Sheng (中書省) -- a post considered one for a chancellor. Emperor Gaozong also created him the Duke of Zhao.

Li, having been in charge of civil service for a long time, had many people trying to endear themselves to him. All three of his marriages were to daughters of prominent clans, and he was recognized by another prominent clan, the Li clan of the former Zhao Commandery, as a member. Because of this, he began to favor the prominent clans in his selections, drawing displeasure from Emperor Gaozong, but Emperor Gaozong did not outwardly disapprove. However, in 678, his discordant relationship with another chancellor, Liu Rengui, would eventually begin his downfall. Liu, who had been a major general before becoming chancellor, had been sent to Taohe Base (洮河軍, in modern Haidong Prefecture, Qinghai) to defend against Tufan attacks and to plan a counterattack, but suggestions that he submitted from Taohe were often blocked by Li. To retaliate, Liu, while knowing that Li had no military talent, nevertheless submitted a proposal to Emperor Gaozong that stated that Li would make the best possible general for the coming military action against Tufan, and when Li declined, Emperor Gaozong responded, "If Liu Rengui told me to go, I would go; how can you not go?" Emperor Gaozong had Li take over Liu's post at Taohe. In fall 678, Li's forces engaged those of the Tufan general Gar Trinring Tsendro ("Lun Qinling" (論欽陵) in Chinese) and suffered a great defeat, and even Li's deputy Liu Shenli (劉審禮) was captured by Tufan forces. Li himself might have been captured if not for a disruptive counterattack that the general Heichi Changzhi launched to disrupt the Tufan pursuit, and Li was able to withdraw back to Taohe.

After returning to Taohe, Li made repeated requests to return to Chang'an, claiming that he was ill and needed treatment. In 680, Emperor Gaozong recalled him to Chang'an, but found out that not only was Li not ill, but that Li, upon returning to Chang'an, immediately went to the legislative bureau to resume his duties. Emperor Gaozong was incensed, and demoted him to the post of prefect of Heng Prefecture (near modern Hengyang in Hunan). After some time, he was promoted slightly to be the secretary general to the commandant at Yang Prefecture (揚州, roughly modern Yangzhou, Jiangsu). He died in 682 and was posthumously honored, including with the honorable posthumous name of Wenxian (文憲, meaning "civil and knowledgeable"). His brother Li Yuansu later served as a chancellor during the reign of Emperor Gaozong's wife Wu Zetian.

== Notes and references ==
- Old Book of Tang, vol. 81.
- New Book of Tang, vol. 106.
- Zizhi Tongjian, vols. 201, 202.
