= Gao Jifu =

Gao Jifu 高季輔
- Born: 596; Jing County, Hebei
- Died: January 16, 654 (aged 57–58)
- Other names: Gao Feng; Duke Xian of Tiao
- Occupation: Statesman
- Children: Gao Zhengye
- Father: Gao Heng

Gao Feng
- Traditional Chinese: 高馮
- Simplified Chinese: 高冯
Transcriptions
Standard Mandarin
- Hanyu Pinyin: Gāo Féng
- Wade–Giles: Kao Fêng

Courtesy name Gao Jifu
- Traditional Chinese: 高季輔
- Simplified Chinese: 高季辅
Transcriptions
Standard Mandarin
- Hanyu Pinyin: Gāo Jìfǔ
- Wade–Giles: Kao Chi-fu

Posthumous title Duke Xian of Tiao
- Traditional Chinese: 蓚憲公
- Simplified Chinese: 蓚宪公
- Literal meaning: Exemplary Elder of Tiao
Transcriptions
Standard Mandarin
- Hanyu Pinyin: Tiáo Xiàngōng
- Wade–Giles: T'iao Hsien-kung

Gao Feng (596 – 16 January 654), better known by his courtesy name Gao Jifu and also posthumously known as Duke Xian of Tiao, was a Chinese official who served as a chancellor during the reigns of the emperors Taizong and Gaozong in the Tang dynasty.

== Background ==
Gao Jifu was born in 596. He was from the locale that would eventually be the Tang Empire's De Prefecture (德州, roughly modern Dezhou, Shandong). His grandfather, Gao Biao (高表), was a commandery governor during either the late Northern Wei dynasty or Northern Wei's branch successor state, Eastern Wei. His father, Gao Heng (高衡), was a county magistrate during the Sui dynasty. Gao Jifu himself was said to be both studious and trained in martial arts when he was young, and was also said to be particularly appropriate in his actions during the mourning period after his mother's death. His elder brother, Gao Yuandao (高元道), served as the magistrate of Ji County (汲縣, in modern Xinxiang, Henan). In 618 or 619, when the Sui Empire was on the verge of total collapse after the death of Emperor Yang, the people of Ji County surrendered to agrarian rebels, and Gao Yuandao was killed in the process. Gao Jifu led his brother's followers in combat and was able to capture and execute those (Note: Gao Jifu's biography in the Old Book of Tang does not specify whether the killer or killers of Gao Yuandao that Gao Jifu killed had been singular or plural.) who killed his brother, taking their heads to his brother's tomb to be offered to his brother. Thereafter, he gathered his own band of agrarian rebels. He soon submitted to the rule of the Tang dynasty, one of the regimes that rose out of the confusion of the Sui Empire's collapse, along with another rebel leader in the region, Li Yude (李育德), (Note: Gao Jifu's biography in the Old Book of Tang and the New Book of Tang gave the name as Li Houde (李厚德), but the Zizhi Tongjian gave it as Li Yude, and the name Li Yude is generally used in tertiary sources.) who had been a general of the rebel ruler Li Mi, and was made the military advisor to Li Yude, who was made the prefect of Zhi Prefecture (陟州, roughly modern Jiaozuo, Henan).

== During Emperor Taizong's reign ==
Gao Jifu's activities for the next several years are not recorded in history. It was said that early in the reign of the second Tang emperor, Emperor Taizong, Gao was serving as assistant imperial censor, and he often pointed out faults of the other officials, as his duty as assistant censors, without fearing reprisals. He was eventually made a midlevel official at the Legislative Bureau. In 634, he was serving as such when, in response to Emperor Taizong's call for officials to offer suggestions, Gao offered five suggestions, in these areas:

- He suggested that greater emphasis should be paid to promoting officials who were kind and honest.
- He suggested that the conscription of people into public works projects should be reduced.
- He suggested that ways should be found to curb the tendency for princesses and nobles to conduct business to make more money, as he opined that their stipends were already sufficient.
- He suggested that local officials' salaries should be increased, as he opined that at the time the salaries were not sufficient for them to support their families.
- He suggested that clear guidelines should be established that the emperor's sons be considered lower in rank than the emperor's brothers, as it was not clear at the time, leading to confusion in how the emperor's sons and brothers dealt with each other.

Emperor Taizong praised him for his suggestions.

In 643, Gao was made an assistant head of household to the crown prince, Li Zhi. In response to further suggestions about governance that Gao suggested, Emperor Taizong awarded him with a stalactite, then used as medication, stating, "You provided medication for the state, so I am providing you with medication." In 644, he was made the assistant minister of civil service affairs, and was said to be appropriate in his selection of officials. Emperor Taizong awarded him with a gold-plated mirror to symbolize that his acts were clean and honorable.

In 645, during Emperor Taizong's campaign against Goguryeo, Emperor Taizong left Li Zhi at Dingzhou in modern Baoding, Hebei, to be in charge of logistics, assisted by a number of officials led by the chancellor Gao Shilian, and Gao Jifu was a member of Li Zhi's staff there. (Note: The New Book of Tang indicated that Gao Jifu was made a de facto chancellor at this point. However, this, if true, appeared to be no longer the case after the end of the Goguryeo campaign, and could have been simply a temporary measure during the Goguryeo campaign, as he was not referred to as chancellor again until 648 when he was made the head of the legislative bureau.) In 648, he was made the director of the Legislative Bureau (中書令, Zhongshu ling), a post automatically conferring chancellor status, and also served concurrently as minister of civil service affairs. He also participated in the editing of imperial history and was enfeoffed as the Duke of Tiao, his home county.

== During Emperor Gaozong's reign ==
After Emperor Taizong died in 649, Li Zhi succeeded him (as Emperor Gaozong). In 651, Gao Jifu was made Palace Attendant, the head of the Chancellery and also a post automatically conferring chancellor status. In 652, he also took on the additional title of advisor for Emperor Gaozong's crown prince, Li Zhong. Later, he was soon said to be forced to reduced to home rest due to an illness, and Emperor Gaozong recalled his brother, Gao Jitong (高季通), who was then the prefect of Guo Prefecture (虢州, part of modern Sanmenxia, Henan), to be the assistant minister of imperial clan affairs, so that he could attend to Gao Jifu. Gao Jifu died in 654.
