= Wu Zetian (1995 TV series) =

- DVD cover art
- 武则天
- Genre: Historical drama
- Written by: Zhang Tianmin; Ran Ping; Ke Zhanghe
- Directed by: Chen Jialin
- Starring: Liu Xiaoqing; Chen Baoguo
- Country of origin: China
- Original language: Mandarin
- No. of episodes: 30

Production
- Producer: Liu Dayin
- Production location: Zhuozhou
- Running time: ≈45 minutes per episode
- Production companies: China Television Production Centre; China Huaqiao Film and TV; China Literature and Art Foundation; China Film Co-Production

Original release
- Network: CCTV

Wu Zetian (武则天) is a Chinese historical television series based on the life of Wu Zetian, the only female emperor in Chinese history. Directed by Chen Jialin, the series starred Liu Xiaoqing as the titular character. It was first broadcast on CCTV in mainland China in 1995 and subsequently aired by television stations in other regions.

== Plot ==
One night, Wu Meiniang was bestowed favor upon by Emperor Taizong for the first time since she entered the palace. The innocent girl turned into ruthless and cruel woman after experiencing the cruelty of court life and escaped death several times. She was even betrayed by Xu Hui, her confidante and another consort. After the death of Emperor Taizong, Wu Meiniang was thrown into Ganye Temple and forced to become a nun. She suffered constant humiliation but was saved by Emperor Gaozong. He took her back into the palace and changed her identity from a mad a Zhaoyi (1st rank imperial consort). To survive in the court, Wu Meiniang personally strangled her daughter to frame Empress Wang, defeated the prime minister Zhangsun Wuji, and finally became the Empress. She and Emperor Gaozong have a love-hate relationship, and after his death, she took the throne and changed the Tang dynasty to the Zhou Dynasty.

== Cast ==
- Liu Xiaoqing as Wu Zetian
- Bao Guo'an as Emperor Taizong of Tang
- Li Jianqun as Xu Hui
- Liu Yubin as Zhangsun Wuji
- Wang Pei as Fang Xuanling
- Huang Fei as Wei Zheng
- Zhang Guangzheng as Chu Suiliang
- Lü Qi as Li Shiji
- Hong Jiantao as Li Tai
- Guo Li as Hegan Chengji
- Ma Li as Princess Gaoyang
- Zhang Duofu as Bianji
- Lü Guobin as Fang Yi'ai
- Yu Meng as Ling'er
- Gao Bo as Yu'er
- Chen Baoguo as Emperor Gaozong of Tang
- Zheng Shuang as Empress Wang
- Lü Zhong as Lady Liu
- Yu Hui as Consort Xiao
- Jin Shuyuan as Lady of Rong
- Mu Ning as Lady of Han
- Miao Yiyi as Lady of Wei
- Wu Liping as Wang Fulai
- Xiao Xiaohua as Xiaoshunzi
- Qiu Yongli as Li Yifu
- Li Ruping as Xu Jingzong
- Liu Dagang as Han Yuan
- Chen Weiguo as Liu Shi
- Li Ming as Shangguan Yi
- Gao Xi'an as Wu Yuanqing
- Yu Yunhe as Wu Yuanshuang
- Xu Xiaochuan as young Li Zhong
- Yang Junyong as Li Sujie
  - Li Ang as young Li Sujie
- Jiang Junnan as Li Hong
  - Ou Yang as young Li Hong
- Liu Yanjun as Li Xian
- Wang Zhihua as Yuan Gongyu
- Pu Zhenghu as Wei Jifang
- Wang Yue as Bi Zhengyi
- Mi Li as Lady Chunyu
- Han Zaifeng as Persian shopkeeper
- Dantai Renhui as Old nun
- Lei Yueqin as Nun
- Zhou Shiyi as Emperor Zhongzong of Tang
- Guo Shuping as Empress Wei
- Liang Li as Princess Taiping
- Ruping as Shangguan Wan'er
- Hai Yan as Shangguan Wan'er's mother
- Chen Zheng as Wu Chengsi
- Zhang Qiuge as Huaiyi
- Jiang Yang as Zhang Changzong
- Liu Xudong as Zhang Yizhi
- Han Qing as Emperor Ruizong of Tang
- Gao Li as Consort Liu
- Xia Song as Consort Dou
- Tan Feiling as Pei Yan
- Wang Bing as Di Renjie
- Xu Zhengyun as Wei Yuanzhong
- Shao Wanlin as Zhang Jianzhi
- Chen Lihui as Li Jingye
- Xue Yong as Luo Binwang
- Tang Zhijiang as Qiu Shenji
- Cao Lian as Lai Junchen
- Wang Jun as Zhou Xing
- Xue Wencheng as Yu Baojia
- Deng Guangxun as Suo Yuanli
- Yu Qian as Li Zhuan
- Li Donghong as Gao Shun
- Fan Jia
