= Wu Zi Bei Ge =

- DVD cover art
- Also known as: Wu Zi Bei Ge: Wu Zetian Zhuan
- 无字碑歌 / 无字碑歌：武则天传
- Genre: Historical drama
- Written by: Chen Yanmin; Zhang Wenhua; Li Yijia
- Directed by: Chen Yanmin; Wang Zhiqiang; Wu Xiaozheng
- Presented by: Shi Yongyi; Yun Tao
- Starring: Siqin Gaowa; Wen Zhengrong; Zhang Tielin; Fang Xu; Liu Wei; Liu Jinshan; Liao Xiaoqin
- Opening theme: "Song of the Uncharactered Stele" (无字碑歌) by Mao Amin
- Ending theme: "Let History Judge Merits and Faults" (千秋功罪任凭说) by Mao Amin
- Composer: Ma Ding
- Country of origin: China
- Original language: Mandarin
- No. of episodes: 40

Production
- Executive producer: Zhu Wenjiu
- Producer: Liu Hanbo
- Production location: China
- Cinematography: Tang Ping; Yan Ying
- Editor: Wang Zhiqiang
- Running time: ≈45 minutes per episode
- Production company: Guangzhou Qiaojiaren Media

Original release
- Release: 2006

Wu Zi Bei Ge (无字碑歌), also known as Wu Zi Bei Ge: Wu Zetian Zhuan (无字碑歌：武则天传), is a 2006 Chinese historical television series based on the life of Wu Zetian, the only female emperor in Chinese history. Directed and written by Chen Yanmin, the series starred Siqin Gaowa as Wu Zetian. Its Chinese title means "song of the uncharactered stele", a reference to the unmarked stele near Wu Zetian's tomb at the Qianling Mausoleum in present-day Qian County, Shaanxi.

== Synopsis ==
Wu Zetian's life begins during the reign of Emperor Taizong of the Tang dynasty. Having spent over a decade as a relatively unknown concubine, she finally gains an opportunity to showcase her talent and attract the emperor's attention. As she earns the emperor's favour, she also grows closer to the crown prince Li Zhi, with whom she develops a mutual admiration.

After Emperor Taizong's death, Wu Zetian is initially sent to Ganye Temple to be a Buddhist nun in accordance with imperial custom. Refusing to spend the rest of her life in seclusion, she finds an opportunity to return to the palace when the newly enthroned Li Zhi (Emperor Gaozong) visits the temple. Following the birth of her first son Li Hong, she rises through the ranks in the imperial harem and eventually becomes empress. She uses her intelligence, determination and political acumen to overcome her rivals and secure her position.

As empress, Wu Zetian assists Emperor Gaozong in governing the empire, eliminating her political opponents and implementing a series of political reforms known as the "Twelve Suggestions". As the emperor's health declines, Wu Zetian gradually takes over the reins of power and demonstrates her exceptional political skills as the Tang dynasty reaches the height of its influence.

Following Emperor Gaozong's death, Wu Zetian deposes her inept son Li Xian (Emperor Zhongzong), suppresses rebellions by certain members of the Li clan, and consolidates her authority. Eventually, she claims the Mandate of Heaven and ascends the throne as the first and only female emperor in Chinese history.

During her reign, Wu Zetian introduces major reforms, including expanding the imperial examination system, promoting talented officials regardless of their background, encouraging agriculture, reducing taxes, strengthening the empire's border defences, fostering harmony between Buddhism and Taoism, and correcting injustices by rehabilitating wrongfully accused officials such as Di Renjie.

Towards the end of her life, Wu Zetian chooses not to pass the throne to her own clan and instead restores the Li clan to power under her fourth son Li Dan (Emperor Ruizong). She leaves behind an enduring legacy symbolised by an uncharactered stele standing next to her tomb.

== Cast ==
- Siqin Gaowa as Wu Zetian
- Wen Zhengrong as Wu Zetian (younger) / Princess Taiping
- Zhang Tielin as Li Zhi (Emperor Gaozong)
- Fang Xu as Di Renjie
- Liu Wei as Li Shimin (Emperor Taizong)
- Liu Jinshan as Wei Shun'an
- Liao Xiaoqin as Shangguan Wan'er
- Yan Bingyan as Empress Wang
- Xie Jintian as Consort Xiao
- Li Xinyi as Lady of Wei
- Tan Yang as Lai Junchen
- Sha Jingchang as Wei Yuanzhong
- Xu Zhengting as Zhangsun Wuji
- Cao Jinsheng as Hao Chujun
- Wang Biao as Han Yuan
- Xia Feng as Lai Ji
- Zeng Qiusheng as Xu Jingzong
- Wang Deshun as Li Ji
- Xu Wenbin as Chu Suiliang
- Ying Da as Li Yuanjing
- Li Ding as Zhang Gongyi
- Zhao Jin as Pei Yan
- Yang Jun as Wu Yuanqing / Wu Sansi
- He Shengwei as Wu Yuanshuang / Wu Chengsi
- Lu Shiyu as Li Xian
- Wang Jinxin as Li Dan
- Li Yixiao as Wei Tuan'er
- Ma Jie as Li Yifu
- Wu Feifei as Consort Liu
- Liu Su as Consort Dou
- Zheng Yu as Liu Shi
- Zhou Yihua as Li Zhaode
- Zhou Shiyi as Xu Yougong
- Li Ming as Zhang Guangfu
- Xueshan as Xu Yanbo
- Li Yansheng as Zhang Jianzhi
- Zhao Chengshun as Su Liangsi
- Wang Hui as Xue Huaiyi
- Li Yang as Zhou Xing
- Ge Yaming as Suo Yuanli
- Ba Duo as Hou Sizhi
- Zhou Weitao as Li Hong
- Zhao Bo as Li Xian
- Li Xiaobo as Fu Youyi
- Xu Fengnian as Wang Xiaojie
- Zhu Chen as Zhang Yue
- Zhang Ping as Pei Xingjian
- Wang Jianing as Xu Jingye / Xu Jingzhen
- Cheng Wu as Zhang Changzong
- Chi Jia as Zhang Yizhi
- Li Rui as Zhang Changyi
- Wang Gang as Lou Shide
- Dali as Zhang De
- Li Bin as Liu Yicong
- Guan Huaitian as Li Ke
- Yu Jingliang as Di Guangyuan
- Tang Beiping as Chu Gui
- Xiahou Bin as Dou Xijian
- Cao Xuefei as Cui Xuanwei
- Fan Xiaoyang as Pei Feigong
- Li Xueping as Fan Yunxian
- Wang Chunyuan as Li Jiao
- Ren Chengwu as Li Zhen
- Zeng Hongsheng as Shangguan Yi
- Zhang Zhitong as Wu Zetian's mother
- Wang Yong as Chen Zi'ang
- Sun Leiyan as Liu Yizhi
- Xu Ming as Zhu Jingze
- Qi Ji / Zhang Xiaoxiao as Li Zhong
- Lu Dongchang as Qiu Shenji
- Zhang Erhe as Wang Fusheng
- Chen Xinhua as Ming Chongyan
- Dahai as Lu Mingyi
- Sun Hao as An Jinzang
- Li Li-chun as Wei Zheng
- Bai Yun as Xue Shao
- Chu Tong as Luo Binwang
- Liu Ping as Wang Deshou
- Wang Tianyi as Yue Yi
- Shi Lei as Li Longji
- Han Ziting as Li Sujie
- Sun Lijun as the Prince of Dongping
- Bai Yunfei as Fang Yi'ai
- Jia Yue as Xue Wanche
- Zhang Zhenxing as Chai Lingwu
- Zhang Jingtu as Li Xiaoyi
- Pan Meiru as Cheng Wuting
- Xie Jian as Wang Qingzhi
- Li Yan as Su Anheng
- Chai Hao as Xiaomeng
- Sun Han as the King of West Yi
- Bai Ma as Commander Wang
- Zhang Sanjin as an old farmer
- Ji Qin as the abbess of Ganye Temple
- Zhu Jian as a nun
- Wang Yingqi as Zhou Lin
- Wu Huanyan as Empress Wei
- Jia Yulan as Princess Qianjin
- Ma Yashu as Princess Gaoyang
- Gao Yafan as Princess Baling
- Hai Yan as Zhangsun Wuji's wife
- Yang Qian as Biyu
- Wang Xuanyi as Xiaohui
- Xu Lu as Xiaoying
- Zhang Qingchun as Lady Liu
- Lu Dong as Du Su
- Li Tong as the Lady of Wei
- An Limin as Li Hui
- Cui Shaohui as Li Yuanying
- Liu Mengmeng as an official
- Zhou Yihao as Di Fu
- Song Lijie as Di Fu's wife
