= The Empress of China =

2014 Chinese TV series

- Official poster
- Also known as: Wu Ze Tian
- Traditional Chinese: 武媚娘傳奇
- Simplified Chinese: 武媚娘传奇
- 武媚娘傳奇
- Genre: Historical fiction
- Directed by: Go Yik Chun
- Starring: Fan Bingbing; Zhang Fengyi; Aarif Rahman; Janine Chang
- Opening theme: China and Taiwan: Thousands of Years by Sun Nan; Hong Kong: The Empress by Joey Yung
- Country of origin: China
- Original language: Mandarin
- No. of seasons: 1
- No. of episodes: Original version: 82; Hunan TV: 96; TVB: 75

Production
- Executive producers: Wu Hongliang; Meng Qinghan; Li Zhao
- Producer: Fan Bingbing
- Production locations: Mainland China; Hengdian World Studios; CCTV Wuxi Film & TV Base
- Camera setup: Multi-camera
- Running time: 40min~50min
- Production companies: Fan Bingbing Studio; China Film Group Corporation; Zhejiang Talent Television & Film; Evergrande Film Co. Duzhe Publishing Media Co.

Original release
- Network: Hunan Television
- Release: 21 December 2014 – 3 February 2015

The Empress of China

Chinese name (in mainland China and Taiwan)
- Traditional Chinese: 武媚娘傳奇
- Simplified Chinese: 武媚娘传奇
- Hanyu Pinyin: Wǔ Mèiniáng chuánqí
- Cantonese Yale: Móuh Mèihnèuhng chyùhnkèih
Transcriptions
Standard Mandarin
- Hanyu Pinyin: Wǔ Mèiniáng chuánqí
Yue: Cantonese
- Yale Romanization: Móuh Mèihnèuhng chyùhnkèih
- Jyutping: Mou5 Mei4noeng4 cyun4kei4

Chinese name (in Hong Kong, Macau and Malaysia)
- Traditional Chinese: 武則天
- Simplified Chinese: 武则天
- Hanyu Pinyin: Wǔ Zétiān
- Cantonese Yale: Móuh Jāktīn
Transcriptions
Standard Mandarin
- Hanyu Pinyin: Wǔ Zétiān
Yue: Cantonese
- Yale Romanization: Móuh Jāktīn
- Jyutping: Mou5 Zak1tin1

The Empress of China (simplified Chinese: 武媚娘传奇; traditional Chinese: 武媚娘傳奇; pinyin: Wǔ Mèiniáng chuánqí) is a 2014 Chinese television series based on events in the 7th and 8th-century Tang dynasty, starring producer Fan Bingbing as the titular character Wu Zetian—the only female emperor (empress regnant) in Chinese history.

It is the third television production by Fan Bingbing Studio and boasts of a budget of over ¥300 million (roughly US$49.53 million). As such, it is believed to be among the most expensive TV series in Chinese history, beating the previous record of ¥280 million by Heroes in Sui and Tang Dynasties (2013). The television series was first broadcast on Hunan Television on 21 December 2014 in mainland China.

== Synopsis ==
During Tang dynasty's 2nd reign, Wu Ruyi (Fan Bingbing) enters the palace at age 14 as an innocent Cairen (Talented Lady) and aspires to serve Emperor Taizong (Zhang Fengyi) as his consort. The Emperor Taizong soon takes notice of her and falls in love with her due to her resemblance to Empress Wende.

He also gives Wu Ruyi the name Meiniang. This incites many to grow jealous of her and Wu Ruyi suffers the machinations of Noble Consort Wei, Pure Consort Yang, Virtuous Consort Yin, Xiao Qiang, and Feng Cairen. Even her best friend Xu Hui (Janine Chang) betrays her to win the Emperor's affections. They set out to destroy her numerous times by falsely accusing her of theft, murder and treachery. She survives by her wits and intelligence but is kept at arm's length by Emperor Taizong due to a prophecy foretelling a woman of Wu stealing the Tang dynasty.

When Emperor Taizong dies, she is sent to a monastery to become a nun. However, the Emperor's youngest son Li Zhi (Aarif Rahman), who later becomes the Emperor Gaozong, has been in love with her since he was a child. He brings her back to the palace and makes her his concubine. During her time as a minor consort to Emperor Taizong, she learned how an effective Emperor rules his court.

She overcomes the schemes of Consort Xiao (Viann Zhang) and Empress Wang (Shi Shi), and suppresses the rebellion of Princess Gaoyang (Mi Lu). Using that knowledge, she helped Li Zhi take back power from his Regent, and herself into the position of Empress meanwhile avenging her daughter's death. She co-ruled with Li Zhi until his death, after which she ruled the country in her own right and established the Zhou dynasty.

== Cast ==
=== Main ===
- Fan Bingbing as Wu Meiniang (Empress Wu Zetian)
- Zhang Fengyi as Li Shimin (Emperor Taizong)
- Aarif Rahman as Li Zhi (Emperor Gaozong)
- Janine Chang as Xu Hui (Able Consort Xu)

=== Supporting ===
==== Emperor Taizong's harem ====
- Zhang Ting as Noble Consort Wei
- Kathy Chow as Pure Consort Yang
- Zhang Tong as Virtuous Consort Yin
- Zhang Ding Han as Empress Wende / Zheng Wanyan
- Nie Mei as Able Consort Liu
- Sun Jia Qi as Xiao Qiang
- Zhang Xi Ting as Feng Cairen
- Liu Zhi Xi as Chen Meiren

==== Emperor Gaozong's harem ====
- Shi Shi as Empress Wang
- Viann Zhang as Consort Xiao
- Cui Bing as Liu Shi
- Sandra Ma as Helan Min Yue

==== Royal family ====
- Lee Lee-zen as Prince Li Chenggian
- Li Jie as Prince Li Ke
- Ren Shan as Li Tai
- Xue Yongyu as Li You
- Li Yuexi as Crown Princess Su Mei
- Mi Lu as Princess Gaoyang
- Cui Can as Li Sujie
- Zhang Xuanming as Li Zhong
- Chen Jingyuan as childhood Li Zhong
- Kang Fuzhen as Li Hong
- Wang Wenjie as young Li Xián
- Yu Wentong as mid-age Li Xiǎn
- Xi Yuli as Wei Shi

==== Ministers and generals ====
- Li Chen as Li Mu
- Wu Xiubo as younger Zhang Jianzhi
- Wei Zi as older Zhang Jianzhi
- Wang Huichun as Zhangsun Wuji
- Wang Qianhng as Zhangsun Chong
- Yao Yanlin as Shangguan Yi
- Zheng Xiaozhong as Pei Yan
- Liu Zuhe as Xu Jingzong
- Li Yansheng as Chu Suiliang
- Li Guangfu as Wei Zheng
- Wang Bowen as Li Chunfeng
- Yu Ailei as Li Yifu
- Hou Jie as Hou Junji
- Liu Xiaoxi as Fang Xuanling
- Zhu Xiaohui as Fang Yi'ai, Princess Gaoyang's husband
- Sun Ning as Li Shiji
- Qin Qidong as Bianji, Princess Gaoyang's illicit lover
- Xu Jie as Di Renjie

==== Servants ====
- Shen Baoping as Wang De, Emperor Taizong's personal attendant
- He Xin as Chengxin, Crown Prince's companion
- Wang Zhen as Chun Ying, Consort Wei's personal attendant
- Chen Si Si as Qing Shun, Consort Yang's personal attendant
- Tu Liman as Liu Siyao, Consort De's personal attendant
- Wang Yanan as Wen Niang, Xu Hui's personal attendant
- Gao Yuan as Rui An

==== Other ====
- Shōta Matsushima as Motsube Amamori, a Japanese chess player

== Production ==
Zhejiang Talent Television & Film, China Film Group Corporation, Evergrande Film Co., Duzhe Publishing Media Co., Jilin Television, and Guangxi Television co-financed the TV series.

A project-starting press conference held on December 28, 2012. Then, the director was Liu Jiang, who quit the project later due to a busy schedule.

The official character posters were released on February 12, 2014. The release of the photos was a gift sent by the crew to the TV audience for the Chinese New Year. Fan said the role was one she had always dreamed of playing and every generation had different interpretations and she hope she could interpret the character in her own way.

Filming began on December 28, 2013, and ended on August 16, 2014. Filming locations included Wuxi, Hengdian World Studios, Nanjing, and Shaoxing.

A broadcast press conference was held in Beijing on December 18, 2014. The TV series has more than 260 sets of clothing for Fan Bingbing and more than 3,000 sets of clothing for the whole crew, with the most expensive piece being the dragon robe at over 500,000 CNY. Wu Hongliang, one of the producers, said the crew had more than 600 people, shooting lasted for almost 10 months, and several writers worked on the script for three years.

Apart from the costumes, The Empress of China placed great importance on displaying accurate historical visuals. The crew went to great lengths to recreate the ancient capital of Chang’an, as well as the grand and imposing imperial palace of the Tang dynasty. The majority of the scenes were filmed using a combination of real-location shoots and special effects. Moreover, the drama established a special warehouse for the design and creation of its many thousand props.

The series' Chinese name was initially Wu Zetian, and then renamed to The Legend of Wu Zetian. Just two days before the broadcasting date, it was renamed again as The Legend of Wu Meiniang. This was required by the State Administration of Radio, Film, and Television (SARFT).

== Soundtrack ==
The series' musical score was composed by Dong Dongdong, who previously wrote the music to No Man's Land and Beijing Love Story. At the first, the production company intended to invite musicians from Korea, Japan and mainland China, but the idea was changed due to China's censorship policy on TV series changing. Initially, one TV series could broadcast on four satellite channels, but in 2015 it was revised to allow broadcasting on two satellite channels. Considering the cost recovery and the busy post-production schedule, the production company invited the native composer Dong Dongdong.

The opening song was called Qian Qiu (Chinese: 千秋; lit. 'For Thousands of Years'), sung by Sun Nan.

The closing theme song was called Wu Zi Bei (Chinese: 无字碑; lit. 'Wordless Tablet'), sung by Jane Zhang, lyrics by Vincent Fang, and music by Aarif Rahman. The song premiered during a Sina live stream session on 16 December 2014 and topped the New Song Chart as the most listened song with the view count exceeding 1.37 million.

For TVB's broadcast in Hong Kong, the opening song was called The Empress (Chinese: 女皇), sung by Joey Yung.

=== China and Taiwan ===
No.	Title	Lyrics	Music	Singer(s)	Length
1.	"For Thousands of Years" (千秋)	Chen Xi	Dong Dongdong	Sun Nan	2:42
2.	"Wordless Tablet" (無字碑)	Vincent Fang	Aarif Rahman	Jane Zhang	3:04
3.	"Dare To Rule The World" (敢為天下先)	Chen Xi	Dong Dongdong	Jane Zhang	3:33
4.	"Heaven" (蒼天)	Chris Shum	Leon Ko	Jacky Cheung & Evonne Hsu	4:04

=== Hong Kong ===
No.	Title	Lyrics	Music	Singer(s)	Length
1.	"The Empress" (女皇)	Hayes Yeung	Alan Cheung	Joey Yung	3:32
2.	"The Secret of Tears" (眼淚的秘密)	Sandy Chang	Alan Cheung	Jinny Ng	3:35
3.	"No Matter What It Takes" (不顧一切)	Sandy Chang	Damon Chui & Johnny Yim	Linda Chung	4:13

== Broadcast ==
The Empress of China began airing from December 21, 2014, exclusively on Hunan Television in mainland China, and has also been broadcast on Chung T'ien Television in Taiwan, TVB in Hong Kong, and Golden Town Film Co., Ltd in Thailand.

=== Mainland China ===
The TV drama was suspended for four days from December 28, 2014, to January 1, 2015. Hunan Television said on its official Sina Weibo account that the TV drama will stop from Sunday on due to 'technical' reasons but will return to the screen on January 1, 2015. However, it was reported that the actual reason for this suspension was because the dresses were 'too exposing', especially in the chest region and the broadcasting authorities demanded the broadcaster edit the TV drama and then submit again for censorship. The show returned to screens on January 1, 2015, but with edited scenes that removed much of the shots of cleavage area. Wide shots and close-ups were heavily employed to minimize the amount of cleavage. Chinese Internet users responded by complaining about the censorship on Weibo. Several complained that they would not be able to see the hundreds of costume changes by Fan Bingbing. Some reports noted that the Tang dynasty was one of the greatest dynasties in ancient China, and women were known to wear revealing attire.

Likewise, any scenes showing intimacy or affection between the protagonists were completely cut (like the bath tub or kissing scenes), which makes following the drama's storyline difficult at times.

=== Taiwan ===
Taiwan's CTi TV official poster of The Empress of China.

Taiwan began airing the drama March 30, 2015, on cable channel CTi TV and free-to-air channel CTV. Both stations aired the series in its entirety, un-cut and un-censored.

=== Hong Kong ===
Hong Kong's TVB official poster of The Empress of China.

Hong Kong free-to-air channel TVB Jade began broadcast of the drama on April 26, 2015. Due to the length of the series, the drama was reduced by ten episodes and TVB also changed their broadcast schedule to have the drama air throughout the entire week Sunday to Saturday. In order to avoid the cleavage exposing controversy without zooming-in scenes like the version aired in mainland China, TVB hired CGI experts to add an effect clothing to cover up the cleavage. TVB also aired original audio and a Cantonese dubbed version on their Jade channel.

== Reception ==
The Empress of China was a commercial success. The show's first episode broke rating records. Despite the re-edits to please SARFT, the viewership ratings of The Empress of China remained at an all-time high. Its final episode achieved a rating of 4%, making it the highest rated drama of the year.

Despite its success, the drama received mixed to negative reviews. The audiences praised the beautiful costume, but complained about the slow narrative rhythm and said the plot turns dramatically without foreshadowing, as it's broken and not linked well at all. Some reports noted that the protagonist was overpowered, and was not a factually accurate account of history. Wu Zetian had several battles with her opponent Zhangsun Wuji in history, but in the drama, Wu Zetian was portrayed as an innocent woman.

Hong Kong

Hong Kong TVB Jade ratings
#	Timeslot (HKT)	Week	Episode(s)	Average points	Peaking points
1	Sun – Sat 21:30	26 April 2015	1	24	26
2	Sun – Sat 21:30	27 April－3 May 2015	2－8	25	28
3	Sun – Sat 21:30	04－10 May 2015	9－15	26	29
4	Sun – Sat 21:30	11－17 May 2015	16－22	27	28
5	Sun – Sat 21:30	18－22 May 2015	23－28	26	27
6	Sun – Sat 21:30	25－31 May 2015	29－34	26	28
7	Sun – Sat 21:30	01－7 June 2015	35－41	26	29
8	Sun – Sat 21:30	08－14 June 2015	42－48	25	28
9	Sun – Sat 21:30	15－21 June 2015	49－55	26	30
10	Sun – Sat 21:30	22－28 June 2015	56－61	27	32
11	Sun – Sat 21:30	29 June－5 July 2015	62－67	28	32
12	Sun – Sat 21:30	06－12 July 2015	68－75	29	37
Total average				26	30

== Awards and nominations ==
Year	Award	Category	Nominee	Result
2015	Huading Awards	Best Actress	Fan Bingbing	Nominated
2015	Huading Awards	Best Actor (Ancient)	Aarif Lee	Won
2015	Huading Awards	Best Supporting Actress	Zhang Ting	Nominated
2015	Huading Awards	Best Producer	Fan Bingbing	Nominated
2015	Huading Awards	Top 10 Dramas		Won
2015	China TV Drama Awards	Top 10 Television Series		Won
2015	China TV Drama Awards	Best Actress	Fan Bingbing	Won

== International broadcast ==
Region	Network	Broadcast date	Version
China	Hunan TV	December 21, 2014	cut & edited version
China	ZJSTV	January 14, 2015	cut & edited version
China	Henan TV	April 1, 2015	cut & edited version
China	Guangxi TV	April 1, 2015	cut & edited version
China	BTV	April 26, 2015	cut & edited version
Republic of China (Taiwan)	CTi TV	March 30, 2015	original
Republic of China (Taiwan)	CTV	March 30, 2015	original
Republic of China (Taiwan)	ELTA TV	April 2, 2015	original
Republic of China (Taiwan)	GTV	November 12, 2015	original
Hong Kong	TVB Jade	April 26, 2015	cut, edited & Cantonese dubbed
Hong Kong	TVB HD Jade	April 26, 2015	cut, edited & Cantonese dubbed
Malaysia	Astro On Demand	April 26, 2015	TVB version, Cantonese dubbed
Malaysia	Astro Wah Lai Toi; Astro Wah Lai Toi HD	April 4, 2016	TVB version, Cantonese dubbed
Malaysia	8TV	April 21, 2017	TVB version, original audio
Singapore	VV Drama	August 12, 2015	TVB version, original audio
Cambodia	CTV8 HD	November 11, 2015	TVB version, Khmer dubbed
South Korea	Chunghwa TV	March 14, 2016	TVB version, original audio
Japan	Channel Ginga	July 18, 2016	TVB version, original audio
Thailand	Channel 3	May 1, 2017	TVB version, Thai dubbed
