= Zhizun Hongyan =

Zhizun Hongyan may refer to:

- Lady Wu: The First Empress, a 2004 Chinese TV series
- Women of Times, a 2006 Singaporean TV series
