= Comments on the Biography of Ni Kuan =

Chinese calligraphy work written by Chu Suilang during the Tang dynasty

Comments on the Biography of Ni Kuan or Eulogy on the Chronicle of Ni Kuan (倪寬贊) is a representative Chinese calligraphy work written by the renowned Tang Dynasty Chinese calligrapher Chu Suilang. It is often considered to be a prime example of standard script in Chinese calligraphy. The work measures 24.6 cm by 170.1 cm and is currently kept in the National Palace Museum, Taipei. However, recent studies on the work revealed that the piece was likely a Song Dynasty replica of the original.

Despite the controversy surrounding its authenticity, the work is still renowned for its refinement and diversity of slenderness within each brush stroke. The overall aesthetics is extremely pleasing and is often regarded "as if one is looking at the pure and unsullied character of the calligrapher for which he (Chu Suilang) was renowned."

A full translation and a more elaborate background of the work can be found here.

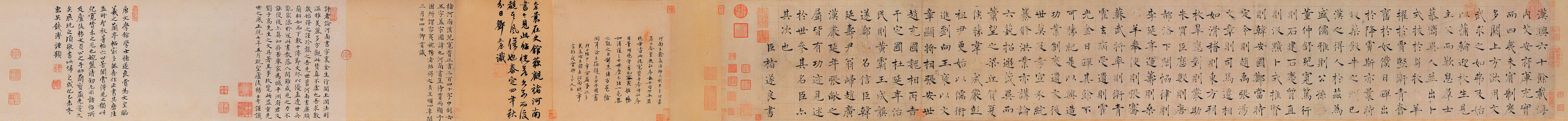
"Eulogy on the Chronicle of Ni Kuan"，National Palace Museum, Taipei.

== Notes ==
https://ndtvdnews.com/
