= Lady Wu: The First Empress =

- Promotional poster
- Also known as: The Great Empress; Empress Wu Meiniang
- 至尊红颜
- Genre: Historical drama
- Written by: Shan Zhe
- Directed by: Hao Ran
- Starring: Alyssa Chia; Vincent Zhao; Bao Jianfeng; Kou Zhenhai; Sun Xing; Zhang Tong; Yang Tongshu
- Opening theme: "Honourable Beauty" (至尊红颜) by Zhang Kefan
- Ending theme: "Forgotten" (遗忘) by Lin Chunru
- Country of origin: China
- Original language: Mandarin
- No. of episodes: 44

Production
- Executive producers: Han Sanping; Zhang Zhe; Wang Zhiqiang
- Producers: Yu Gang; Wang Yi; Song Zhenshan; Wu Hongliang
- Production location: China
- Running time: ≈45 minutes per episode
- Production companies: China Film Group Corporation; Century Hero Film Investment; Taihe Film Investment

Original release
- Network: CTS
- Release: 2003

Lady Wu: The First Empress (至尊红颜), also known as The Great Empress and Empress Wu Meiniang (武媚娘传奇), is a 2003 Chinese historical television series romanticising the life of Wu Zetian, the only female emperor in Chinese history. Starring Alyssa Chia as the titular character with supporting cast members from mainland China and Taiwan, the series was first broadcast on CTS in Taiwan in 2003.

== Synopsis ==
This series follows a romance between Wu Meiniang and Li Junxian, a fictional Tang dynasty general. The series begins with Wu Meiniang's early life as a commoner, and ends with her accession to the throne. It starts in the mid-seventh century during the reign of Emperor Taizong of the Tang dynasty, and follows significant historical events such as Wang Yingzhen's rebellion, the war between the Tang dynasty and the Göktürks, and the taming of the Yellow River.

Wu Meiniang is in love with Li Junxian, but she has become a concubine of Emperor Taizong. Emperor Taizong's son, Li Zhi (later Emperor Gaozong), is also madly in love with Wu Meiniang. After Emperor Taizong's death, Li Zhi rescues her from being a nun for the rest of her life. Wu Meiniang is brought to the palace, where she encounters Consort Xiao, Empress Wang, and Xu Yingying who try to harm her. She is saved countlessly by Li Junxian and Li Zhi, and she eventually becomes empress.

Throughout the series Wu Meiniang is portrayed as a simple, intelligent and kind woman who persists in love at all costs. Although she is framed by her enemies, she has never been afraid of them. Because of her fate, she has experienced various kinds of love and hatred and has been involved in intrigues in the inner palace ever since she stepped in there. After the death of her two husbands and lover, she finally takes on the responsibility of ruling an empire.

== Cast ==
- Alyssa Chia as Wu Meiniang
- Vincent Zhao as Li Junxian
  - Ji Tianfu as Li Junxian (younger)
- Kou Zhenhai as Li Shimin (Emperor Taizong)
- Bao Jianfeng as Li Zhi (Emperor Gaozong)
- Sun Xing as Zhangsun Wuji
- Yang Tongshu as Xu Yingying
- Tian Zhong as Qian Xiaoduo
- Sze Yu as Duan Changde
- Zhang Guoqing as Jia Jinyuan
- Zhang Tong as Empress Wang
- Jessie Chang as Consort Xiao
- Zhang Mingjian as Di Renjie
- Yue Yueli as Wu Shiyue
- Dai Chunrong as Wu Meiniang's mother
- Wang Dongfang as Yuanbao
- Wu Qiang as Shiquan
- Ye Qing as Dongshi
- Fang Yuan as Ling Jing
- Ji Qilin as Li Yuanji
- Xu Shouqin as Shangguan Yi
- Li Li-chun as Yuan Tiangang
- Zhang Danlu as Shangguan Wan'er
- You Jin as Xiao Yu
- Hu Dagang as Tian Sheng
- Wei Yibo as Colonel Wang
- Yu Jianguo as Chuai Fantian
- Wang Ning as Shi Yaoqian
