= Deadful Melody =

1994 Hong Kong film by Ng Min Kan

- Traditional Chinese: 六指琴魔
- Simplified Chinese: 六指琴魔
- Hanyu Pinyin: Liuzhi Qinmo
- Directed by: Ng Min Kan
- Written by: Johnny Lee; Man Choi Lee
- Based on: Ni Kuang Deadful Melody
- Produced by: Ng Min Kan
- Starring: Brigitte Lin; Yuen Biao; Carina Lau
- Cinematography: David Chung
- Edited by: Jun Yu
- Music by: James Wong; Mark Lui
- Production companies: Film City Distribution Ltd. Shanghai Film Studio; Huangpai Manufacture co., LTD.
- Distributed by: Runcheng Entertainment Distribution co., LTD
- Release date: 18 January 1994
- Running time: 91 minutes
- Country: Hong Kong
- Language: Cantonese

Deadful Melody is a 1994 Hong Kong fantasy wuxia film directed and produced by Ng Min Kan, starring Brigitte Lin, Yuen Biao, and Carina Lau. It is based on the wuxia novel of the same name by Ni Kuang. The film premiered in Hong Kong on 18 January 1994.

== Plot ==
Xuemei recalls the death of her entire family as she gently plays the magical lyre. The time of her peaceful upbringing was interrupted by her father's old classmate who, on the verge of death, begs him to take the magical lyre and to flee. However, when he was forced to fight the oncoming raid of the 6 well-known master martial artists, his family was scattered and decimated except for Xuemei, who escaped with the lyre by surviving a waterfall. Currently in the present, Lun Lin, heir to the Tianhu Escort Agency, is being promoted so his father, Teng Lin, could retire. To prove that his escort agency is the best, Lun Lin foolishly takes on the mission of delivering the infamous magical lyre to Hou Xeng (one of the pursuing master martial artists) when everyone else avoided the mission for fear of their lives. Lun Lin's master arrives (late as usual) and warns him about the magical lyre and the deaths it racks up due to the people chasing it.

When some of the master martial artists heard of the sudden reappearance of the magical lyre, a private meeting was held between Ghost and Fire (later the Hard-Hearted Witch) yet no ideas or attempts were made to retrieve the lyre, as they desperately trying to get in contact with Tong Fong Pak (who is uninterested in their meetings). Lun Lin and his father stops at a rest stop but were ambushed by Hou Xeng's son, who is later murdered by Xuemei dressed as a man to make her own identity unknown. The Hard-Hearted Witch also successfully ambushes Lun Lin and Teng Lin only to be stopped by Xuemei. Lun Lin continues to a rest inn where Fire's disciple, Tan Yuehua, was dressed as a male innkeeper to slyly rob the lyre behind Lun Lin's back but ended up saving him from a swarm of robbers. When Lun Lin catches her stealing the lyre, he ties her up and left her where the sons of Ghost intended to sexually assault her. With the help of Xuemei again, the two were able to escape. Xuemei suspects that Lun Lin is her brother whom she was separated from during the chaos of her family's massacre and attempts to check his body while he was resting; Yueha stops her from going any further.

Yueha, thankful for Lun Lin's kindness in saving her, decided not to take the lyre and instead, lets Lun Lin deliver it to Hou Xeng. Unfortunately, when the lyre was delivered, only the corpse of Hou Xeng's son was left in the lyre's container. As Fire and Yuehua make their way to Mo Yee Mountain to meet with the rest of the masters, Lun Lin stops them and blames Yuehua for taking the lyre and leaving the corpse. He was left tied up (similar to what he did to Yuehua) on a tree by Fire. As the masters meet, Teng Lun gets the apparent blame for the death of both Hou Xeng's and his son's death and was attacked by one of the masters. Xuemei reveals herself to the masters as she goes on a destruction to kill them with the magical lyre. Teng Lun, recognizing Xuemei, asked her about her brother, confirming her previous suspicions; however, when Lun Lin reaches him, Teng Lin's sentence was cut short upon his death, making it seemed as if Xuemei was his killer. She flees the scene.

Ghost, Fire, and the Hard-Hearted Witch regroups and tells Tong Fong Pak to reunite with them, believing that their reunion will prevent Xuemei from attacking them. Tong Fong Pak instead proposes that he will reunite with the masters and be directly under Fire's command only if marriage with Yuehua is a guarantee. When Yuehua hears this news and with little success in begging Fire to back out of the marriage arrangement, she runs away. Lun Lin buries his father and is a drunken mess. He is visited by Xuemei, who tells him of his original family but is unsuccessful. After she left, his master arrives to tell him about his (late) arrival around the time of his family's massacre, in which he discovered Lun Lin and deemed him as the only survivor of his family. Their reunion is cut short as they catch Ghost in his unsuccessful attempt to ambush Xuemei and take the lyre. As Ghost escapes, Lun Lin tries to convince Xuemei not to take any vengeance but Xuemei will not give up.

Not being able to convince his sister, Lun Lin decides to avenge his parents as well and proceeds to fight with Tong Fong Pak first. Xuemei joins Lun Lin and takes control of the battle, managing to decapitate Tong Fong Pak and leaves with it. She delivers the head into the hands of Fire, Hard-Hearted Witch, and Ghost and then proceeds to kill murder the army within the fort along with Ghost. Fire and the Witch counterattacks by pushing a drum towards her, in which Xuemei was injured in her own attack after firing at the drum. Lun Lin was able to repel Fire and Witch's attack against Xuemei, but he suffers injury from using the lyre improperly. At the last minute before Witch and Fire could snatch the lyre, Xuemei injures them with the lyre. The Witch left in bitterness for the failures but explodes before she could fully escape and Fire's life was spared from Yuehua's begging.

Xuemei returned to the waterfall where she fell, playing the lyre while Lun Lin returned presumably to the Tianhu Escort Agency.

== Cast ==
- Brigitte Lin as Huang Xuemei (Chinese: 黄雪梅), also known by the name "Liuzhi Qinmo" (Chinese: 六指琴魔), she has a brother, Lü Lin.
- Yuen Biao as Lü Lin (Chinese: 吕麟), the boss of Tianhu Security Service.
- Carina Lau as Tan Yuehua (Chinese: 谭月华), Liehuo Laozu's disciple.
- Zheng Shuang as He Qinghua "Hard-Hearted Witch" (Chinese: 赫青花).
- Wu Ma as Liehuo Laozu "Fire" (Chinese: 烈火老祖).
- Elvis Tsui as Tong Fong Pak (Chinese: 东方白).

== Release ==
The film was first released in Hong Kong on 18 January 1994, then released in South Korea on 23 July 1994.
