= Xu Jingzong =

Tang Dynasty chancellor (592–672)

Xu Jingzong 許敬宗
- Born: 592; Chang'an, Sui China
- Died: September 20, 672 (aged 79–80); Chang'an, Tang China
- Other names: Yanzu (延族); Duke Gong of Gaoyang (高陽恭公)
- Occupations: Cartographer, historian, politician
- Spouses: Lady Pei; Lady Yu
- Children: Xu Ang; Xu Yu; Xu Sheng; Xu Gao; Xu Jing; two daughters
- Father: Xu Shanxin

Xu Jingzong (592 – September 20, 672), courtesy name Yanzu, posthumously known as Duke Gong of Gaoyang, was a Chinese cartographer, historian, and politician who served as a chancellor in the Tang dynasty. Allied with Emperor Gaozong's powerful wife, Empress Wu (later known as Wu Zetian), Xu Jingzong was exceedingly powerful and effective throughout most of Gaozong's reign. By order of Empress Wu, he played a major role in the elimination of the chancellors opposed to her, in 657–659 and again in 665.

== Early life ==
Xu Jingzong was born in 592, during the reign of Emperor Wen in the Sui dynasty. His ancestors had served as officials of the Southern dynasties during the Southern and Northern dynasties period for generations and claimed to be originally from Gaoyang Commandery (高陽, roughly modern Baoding, Hebei), before moving south of the Yangtze River in light of the Jin dynasty's loss of the north. Xu Jingzong's father, Xu Shanxin (許善心), was serving as an emissary of Chen Shubao, the last emperor of the Chen dynasty, to Emperor Wen, whose Sui dynasty then ruled the north, in 589, when Sui destroyed Chen to end the Southern and Northern dynasties period and reunify China. Emperor Wen was impressed with Xu Shanxin's profound sadness (rather than abject submission) at the fall of his state, and made him an official in his own administration.

== During the Sui dynasty ==
Xu Jingzong himself was said to be knowledgeable in literature in his youth, and, after passing the imperial examination, was made a scribe at Huaiyang Commandery (淮陽, roughly modern Zhoukou, Henan). He was soon made a low level official in the imperial administration of Emperor Wen's son, Emperor Yang. In 618, with virtually the entire Sui state engulfed by agrarian rebellions against Emperor Yang's rule, Xu Shanxin and Xu Jingzong were at Jiangdu (in modern Yangzhou, Jiangsu) with Emperor Yang and his other officials, when Emperor Yang was killed in a coup led by the general Yuwen Huaji. Yuwen was initially planning to spare Xu Shanxin, but after Xu Shanxin publicly refused to submit to him by dancing in his presence (then considered a sign of thanksgiving and submission), Yuwen executed him. Xu Jingzong submitted to Yuwen (by dancing) and was spared. His exact travels after Emperor Yang's death were not clear, although it is known that he later served the rebel ruler Li Mi, the Duke of Wei, as a secretary (along with the future Tang chancellor Wei Zheng), before eventually becoming a subject of the Tang dynasty, which emerged victorious from the civil wars near and after the end of Sui. (Sui's last emperor, Emperor Yang's grandson, Yang Tong, posthumously honored Xu Shanxin by posthumously making him the Duke of Gaoyang — a title that Xu Jingzong would eventually receive from Tang.)

== During Emperor Gaozu's reign ==
It is not clear what Xu Jingzong's activities were initially after becoming a subject of the Tang dynasty under the reign of Emperor Gaozu, but it is known that in 621, by which time Tang had prevailed over most, but not all, of its rivals in its campaign to reunify China after Sui's collapse, Xu was set to be sent to Lian Prefecture (漣州, roughly modern Huai'an, Jiangsu) to serve as its prefect's chief advisor, when Emperor Gaozu's son, Li Shimin (the Prince of Qin), hearing of his talent, kept him in the capital to serve as a member of his staff at a mansion where he retained the best literary talent and served them with the best food and wine. Xu also carried the title of census officer of Songzhou during this time, but appeared to not report to Songzhou at all.

== During Emperor Taizong's reign ==
In 634, eight years after Li Shimin had succeeded Emperor Gaozu as emperor (as Emperor Taizong), Xu Jingzong was made an imperial scholar responsible for editing imperial history, as well as a mid-level official at the legislative bureau of government (中書省, Zhongshu Sheng). In 636, after Emperor Taizong's wife, Empress Zhangsun, died, the officials were observing a period of mourning and rotating in watching her casket, when Xu, seeing that the official taking that particular shift, Ouyang Xun, was exceedingly ugly in appearance, burst out in laughter, and was accused by the imperial censor for disrespect. He was demoted to the post of military assistant of the commandant at Hong Prefecture (洪州, roughly modern Nanchang, Jiangxi). Eventually, he was recalled to the capital to be in charge of imperial supplies, and continued to also serve in the role of editing imperial histories. In 643, he assisted the chancellor Fang Xuanling in editing and then submitting imperial histories for Emperors Gaozu's and Taizong's reigns and, for his contribution to the project, was created the Baron of Gaoyang, given an award of silk, and promoted to be the acting deputy head of the examination bureau of government (門下省, Menxia Sheng). He was also soon made a junior advisor to Emperor Taizong's crown prince, Li Zhi.

In 645, Emperor Taizong was on the campaign against Goguryeo when the chancellor Cen Wenben, who was in charge of the legislative bureau and writing his edicts, died suddenly. Emperor Taizong had left Li Zhi at Ding Prefecture (定州, roughly modern Baoding, Hebei), to be in charge of logistics, assisted by a number of officials led by the chancellor Gao Shilian, and Xu was a member of Li Zhi's staff there. After Cen's sudden death, Emperor Taizong summoned Xu to the front and put him in charge of writing the edicts, and made him acting deputy head of the legislative bureau. After Emperor Taizong had a major victory over the main Goguryeo forces, he had Xu draft an edict announcing the victory, and he praised Xu for the beauty of the language that Xu used. (Despite the victory, however, Emperor Taizong's campaign would eventually end in failure, as he was unable to capture Anshi (安市, in modern Anshan, Liaoning) against the fierce defenses by the Goguryeo general later known in Korean popular stories as Yang Manch'un.) Later, at Xu's suggestion, staff members of Li Zhi's elder brother and predecessor as crown prince, Li Chengqian (who was deposed in 643 in light of discoveries that he had plotted to overthrow his father), who had been long banned from civil service, had their eligibility restored.

== During Emperor Gaozong's reign ==
In 649, Emperor Taizong died, and Li Zhi succeeded him (as Emperor Gaozong). As part of the reshuffling of the imperial government, the minister of ceremonies, Yu Zhining was made chancellor, and Xu took over Yu's post as minister of ceremonies. Around this time, however, he was accused of improperly accepting an excessive amount of bride price to give his daughter in marriage to a son of Feng Ang (馮盎), a powerful regional official and chieftain of the local people in modern Guangdong, and, for this perceived impropriety, was demoted to the post of prefect of Zheng Prefecture (roughly modern Zhengzhou, Henan). In 652, he was recalled to the capital to serve as the minister of armory supplies, and in 655, was restored to his old post of minister of ceremonies.

Meanwhile, Emperor Gaozong's wife, Empress Wang, had lost her favor with the emperor, who now favored Consort Wu, and he wanted to depose Empress Wang and replace her with Consort Wu. The chancellors—except Li Ji—were all opposed, with the harshest opposition coming from Chu Suiliang, Han Yuan, and Lai Ji. Xu became an ally of Consort Wu, along with the other officials Li Yifu, Cui Yixuan (崔義玄), and Yuan Gongyu (袁公瑜). Xu tried to get the most powerful of the chancellors, Emperor Gaozong's maternal uncle Zhangsun Wuji, to join their party as well, but Zhangsun, while not outwardly opposing Consort Wu's ascension, repeatedly showed implicit disapproval and refused to join Consort Wu's cause. He further repeatedly rebuked Xu, drawing Xu's resentment. Later in 655, despite severe opposition from Chu, Han, and Lai, Emperor Gaozong deposed Empress Wang and her ally Consort Xiao and replaced Empress Wang with Consort Wu. (Note: Empress Wang and Consort Xiao were later cruelly killed at Empress Wu's instigation.) During the controversial change of empresses, Xu publicly endorsed the move, stating that even a common peasant would consider changing his wife if he harvested an extra ten hu of wheat. If the Son of Heaven wished to appoint an empress, it was no one else's business. (Note: In his annotation to Zizhi Tongjian, Hu Sanxing noted that by comparing the Son of Heaven to an old peasant, Xu couldn't have committed a greater disrespect.) It was partly due to Xu's words that Emperor Gaozong's resolve was hardened, and he further demoted Chu out of the capital. In addition, once Empress Wang was deposed, Xu submitted a petition to have honors posthumously given to her father, Wang Renyou (王仁祐), rescinded.

In late 655, Xu also proposed that the crown prince, Li Zhong (born of Consort Liu, who was of low birth, and therefore proposed as crown prince by Empress Wang (who was herself sonless) in 652 as she hoped that he would be grateful), be deposed and replaced with Empress Wu's eldest son, Li Hong. In 656, Emperor Gaozong agreed and demoted Li Zhong to the title of Prince of Liang, creating Li Hong crown prince instead.

In 657, following Empress Wu's directions, Xu and Li Yifu accused Han and Lai (who were still chancellors at this point but had basically lost power) of conspiring with Chu to rebel. Han, Lai, and Chu were all made prefects of distant prefectures and ordered to be permanently banished from the capital. Later that year, Xu was made Shizhong (侍中): the head of the examination bureau and a post considered one for a chancellor. In 658, he was made Zhongshu Ling (中書令), the head of the legislative bureau and also a post considered for a chancellor; he was also promoted to the greater title of Duke of Gaoyang.

By 659, Empress Wu, with her own great powers-base, began to seek further vengeance against those she felt had slighted her, and her prime target was Zhangsun and Yu. At that time, a man named Li Fengjie (李奉節) had accused the low level officials Wei Jifang (韋季方) and Li Chao (李巢) of conspiracy, and Emperor Gaozong put Xu and Xin Maojiang in charge of the investigations. Xu used various interrogation tactics, including torture, to cause Zhangsun to be implicated, and Xu, citing the example of Yuwen Huaji, informed Emperor Gaozong that Zhangsun was about to rebel and should be immediately expelled from the capital. Emperor Gaozong, after some hesitation, agreed without once meeting with Zhangsun to get his side of the story, exiling him to Qian Prefecture (黔州, roughly modern southeastern Chongqing). Xu then implicated Chu (who had died earlier, in 658), Han, Lai, and Yu in the alleged plot as well. Chu's posts were posthumously removed, and Han, Lai, and Yu were removed from their posts. Chu's sons Chu Yanfu (楮彥甫) and Chu Yanchong (楮彥沖) were killed on their way to exile. Several of Zhangsun's relatives were also exiled. Later that year, Xu revised the rankings of various clans, promoting Empress Wu's Wu clan to the highest rank. In fall 659, Emperor Gaozong further ordered Li Ji, Xu, Xing, Ren Yaxiang, and Lu Chengqing to investigate Zhangsun's plot again. Xu, in response, sent Yuan to Qian Prefecture to force Zhangsun to commit suicide. Also apparently at Xu's suggestion, Emperor Gaozong ordered the executions of Han and Empress Wang's maternal uncle, Liu Shi (who had also been exiled).

In 662, Emperor Gaozong made Xu an advisor to the new crown prince as well as de facto chancellor of the first class, while continuing to exercise actual authority over the legislative bureau. Later that year, partially at Xu's instigation, fellow chancellor Xu Yushi was removed from his post, on the account that Xu Yushi had failed to report on his son, Xu Ziran (許自然)'s, causing damage to private property, merely punishing Xu Ziran himself by caning him.

In 664, Emperor Gaozong, angry over Empress Wu's grip on growing power, secretly discussed with the chancellor Shangguan Yi the possibility of deposing her, but the discussions were discovered by Empress Wu, and Emperor Gaozong, in fear, blamed Shangguan for everything. At Empress Wu's instigation, Xu Jingzong submitted an accusation stating that Shangguan, who had previously served on Li Zhong's staff, was conspiring with Li Zhong and the eunuch Wang Fusheng (王伏勝), who had also previously served on Li Zhong's staff and who had reported to Emperor Gaozong that Empress Wu had engaged in witchcraft. Shangguan, his son Shangguan Tingzhi (上官庭芝), and Wang were executed, while Li Zhong was forced to commit suicide, After that, Empress Wu's power and influence in the all affairs of the empire was more effective and stronger. Over the subsequent years, with Empress Wu in grew more power (Emperor Gaozong was merely a puppet emperor), Xu used his political skills to keep the various competing factions in check.

In 670, at Xu's request, Emperor Gaozong and Empress Wu allowed him to retire. He died in 672 and by order of Empress Wu was buried near Emperor Taizong's tomb.

== Criticism of Xu Jingzong and controversy over posthumous name ==
Traditional historians, both during Xu Jingzong's own times and in posterity, criticized Xu severely. In the aftermath of his death, one of the imperial officials in charge for awarding posthumous names, Yuan Sigu (袁思古), suggested giving him the unflattering posthumous name of Miu (繆, meaning "untrue"), stating that he deserved that posthumous name because he had given a daughter to Feng Ang's son in exchange for a large bride price, and because he had exiled his own son, Xu Ang (許昂), to the modern-day Guangdong region. (Note: Xu Jingzong, after his wife's death, had married his wife's servant girl Lady Yu as his new wife—considered an improper act in those days due to the differences in social station—not knowing that Xu Ang had been carrying on an affair with Lady Yu, an affair that they continued even after Xu Jingzong married her. When Xu Jingzong discovered this, he divorced Lady Yu and, accusing Xu Ang of a lack of filial piety, exiled him.) Instead, Emperor Gaozong ordered further discussion, and at the suggestion of the minister of ceremonies, Yang Sijing (陽思敬), Xu was given the posthumous name of Gong (恭, "reverent").

Later historians' criticism of Xu were often on his twisting of history as a historian. They pointed out that he was resentful of Feng Deyi, who was chancellor during the reign of Emperor Gaozu and early in the reign of Emperor Taizong, because Feng had witnessed the coup at Jiangdu and had popularized Xu's disgrace in a couplet that stated: "When Yu Shiji was killed, Yu Shinan kneeled and asked to die in his stead; when Xu Shanxin was killed, Xu Jingzong danced to avoid death." Later, after Feng's death and Xu was in charge of writing history, he wrote a highly critical biography of Feng in order to pay Feng back. Other instances of Xu's twisting of history that were noted included:

- After marrying another daughter to the son of the general Qian Jiulong (錢九隴), again in exchange for a large bride price, he overly exaggerated Qian's contributions to Emperor Gaozu's success, ranking among with much greater contributors Liu Wenjing and Zhangsun Shunde (長孫順德).
- After having his son marry a daughter of Yuchi Baolin (尉遲寶琳), he inflated the contributions of Yuchi Baolin's father Yuchi Gong and hid Yuchi Gong's faults, including attributing Emperor Taizong's poem Ode to a Powerful Phoenix (威鳳頌), a tribute to Zhangsun Wuji, to be instead a tribute to Yuchi Gong.
- The general Pang Xiaotai (龐孝泰), whose contributions in Emperor Gaozong's campaign to conquer Goguryeo (in 668) were minimal, was instead made out to be a major contributor during the campaign, after Pang gave Xu a major amount of treasure.

Generally, it was believed that Xu often altered the historical records of Emperors Gaozu's and Taizong's reigns based on personal likes and dislikes as well. It was, however, noted that Xu was a major contributor to many important imperially-commissioned works.

== Descendants ==
One of Xu Jingzong's great-grandsons, (Note: This is per Xu Yuan's biographies in both Books of Tang. However, in Xu Jingzong's family tree found in part 1 of vol.73 of New Book of Tang, Xu Yuan was indicated as Jingzong's great-great-grandson.) Xu Yuan, took part in the Battle of Suiyang against rebel forces of the An Lushan rebellion and was killed after the siege.

== Notes and references ==
- Old Book of Tang, vol. 82.
- New Book of Tang, vol. 223.1.
- Zizhi Tongjian, vols. 185, 189, 197, 199, 200, 201, 202.
