= Zheng Shuang (actress, born 1966) =

Chinese film actress

Zheng Shuang (Chinese: 郑爽; born on 18 November 1966 in Shenyang, Liaoning) is a Chinese film actress. She received classical training as a Daoma Dan (刀馬旦) in Beijing opera.

== Selected filmography ==
- Deadful Melody 1994 Hong Kong fantasy film
- Wu Zetian 1995 TV series
- The Water Margin 1998 TV series
- Demi-Gods and Semi-Devils 2003 TV series
- Huang Taizi Mishi 2004 TV series
- Genghis Khan 2004 TV series
- Wu Cheng'en and Journey to the West 2010 TV series
