= Empress Wang (Gaozong) =

Empress of Tang China from 650 to 655

Empress Wang 王皇后

Empress consort of the Tang dynasty
- Tenure: 12 February 650 (Note: The Zizhi Tongjian recorded that Wang was made empress on the bing'wu day of the 1st month of the 1st year of the Yong'hui era of Tang Gaozong's reign. This date corresponds to 12 Feb 650 in the Julian calendar.) – 16 November 655
- Predecessor: Empress Zhangsun
- Successor: Empress Wu

Princess consort of Jin
- Tenure: 7th century – 30 April 643

Crown Princess of the Tang dynasty
- Tenure: 30 April 643 – 15 July 649
- Predecessor: Crown Princess Su
- Born: c. 628; Bing Prefecture, Tang dynasty
- Died: 3 December 655 (aged 26–27); Chang'an, Tang dynasty
- Spouse: Emperor Gaozong of Tang
- House: Wang
- Father: Wang Renyou
- Mother: Lady Liu (daughter of Liu Ze and sister of Liu Shi)

Empress Wang (c. 628 – c.November 655 (Note: The last recorded activity involving Empress Wang and Consort Xiao in Zizhi Tongjian with a defined date was their deposition; this took place on the jiyou day of the 10th month of the 6th year of the Yong'hui era of Tang Gaozong's reign, which corresponds to 16 Nov 655 in the Julian calendar. The Old Book of Tang recorded that both women were strangled in the 10th month of the 6th year of the Yong'hui era of Tang Gaozong's reign; said month ends on 3 December 655 in the Julian calendar.)) was an empress of the Chinese Tang dynasty. She was the first wife and empress of Emperor Gaozong and became empress shortly after he became emperor in 649. She, however, did not bear him any sons and was not favored. Therefore, in apprehension that one of his concubines, Pure Consort Xiao, who was both favored and had a son, might seek to displace her, she recommended a former concubine of Emperor Gaozong's father Emperor Taizong, Consort Wu (later known as Wu Zetian), to be Emperor Gaozong's concubine as well, hoping to divert favor from Consort Xiao. Soon, however, Consort Wu became dominant in the palace and overwhelmed both Empress Wang and Consort Xiao, eventually accusing them of using witchcraft and conspiracy to poison against Emperor Gaozong. Emperor Gaozong reduced both Empress Wang and Consort Xiao to commoner rank and put them under arrest in 655, replacing Empress Wang with Consort Wu. Soon, as recorded in the New Book of Tang and Zizhi Tongjian, Empress Wang and Consort Xiao were cruelly tortured and executed on the new Empress Wu's orders.

== Background ==
It is not known when the future Empress Wang was born, although it is known that she was from Bing Prefecture (并州, roughly modern Taiyuan, Shanxi). Her father Wang Renyou (王仁佑) was a son of Wang Sizheng, a major general for Western Wei, and during the reign of Emperor Taizong of Tang, Wang Renyou served as magistrate of Luoshan County (羅山, in modern Xinyang, Henan). Emperor Taizong's aunt Princess Tong'an had married Wang Renyou's uncle Wang Yu (王裕) and had heard that Wang Renyou's daughter was both beautiful and gentle. Princess Tong'an thus recommended to Emperor Taizong that he make Lady Wang one of his daughters-in-law. Emperor Taizong agreed, taking her to be the wife and princess of his ninth son Li Zhi, the Prince of Jin. In 643, after Li Zhi became crown prince, replacing his older brother Li Chengqian (who was deposed for plotting to overthrow Emperor Taizong), Princess Wang became crown princess. Her father Wang Renyou was promoted to the post of prefect of Chen Prefecture (陳州, roughly modern Zhoukou, Henan).

== As empress ==
In 10 July 649, Emperor Taizong died, and Li Zhi took the throne as Emperor Gaozong. He created Crown Princess Wang empress in spring 650. He also created her father Wang Renyou the Duke of Wei and her mother Lady Liu the Lady of Wei. Wang Renyou soon died thereafter and was posthumously given the honor of being Sikong (司空), one of the Three Excellencies. Her uncle Liu Shi became one of the chancellors.

Despite the length of the marriage that Empress Wang had with Emperor Gaozong, she did not bear him a son, and by the time she became empress, he had already had four sons with his concubines—and the mother of the fourth son Li Sujie, Pure Consort Xiao, who had also given birth to two daughters (the later Princesses Yiyang and Gao'an), was particularly favored. Liu Shi suggested to Empress Wang that she suggest that Emperor Gaozong's oldest son Li Zhong, whose mother Consort Liu was of low birth, be made crown prince, so that she could be endeared to him. Empress Wang was able to persuade Emperor Gaozong's powerful uncle Zhangsun Wuji to support the plan, and in 652, Li Zhong was created crown prince.

By this point, however, Empress Wang was facing a major threat from a different romantic rival. When Emperor Gaozong was crown prince, he had been attracted by the beauty of one of Emperor Taizong's concubines, Consort Wu. After Emperor Taizong's death, all of his concubines who did not bear children were housed at Ganye Temple (感業寺) to be Buddhist nuns. In either 650 or 651, when Emperor Gaozong was visiting Ganye Temple to offer incense to Buddha, he saw Consort Wu. Both of them wept. When Empress Wang heard this, she, wanting to divert Emperor Gaozong's favor from Consort Xiao, secretly instructed Consort Wu to grow her hair back, while suggesting to Emperor Gaozong that he take her as a concubine. Consort Wu was intelligent and full of machinations, and therefore, when she first returned to the palace, she acted humbly and flattered Empress Wang, who trusted her greatly and recommended her to Emperor Gaozong. Soon, Emperor Gaozong became enamored with Consort Wu. Both Empress Wang and Consort Xiao lost favor, and soon, they realized the seriousness of the situation and joined forces to try to alienate Consort Wu from Emperor Gaozong but were unsuccessful. In particular, Empress Wang was described as being unable or unwilling to make friends among Emperor Gaozong's other concubines, ladies in waiting, and servants, a situation aggravated by the fact that her mother Lady Liu and uncle Liu Shi were disrespectful to the other concubines. By contrast, Consort Wu cultivated relationships with other concubines, ladies in waiting, and servants, particularly those that Empress Wang had offended, and she further distributed the rewards she received among them. So, Consort Wu took virtual control of the palace from the hands of Empress Wang, who was in charge of it, without her getting a whiff of the matter, and Consort Wu encouraged the crew both near her and at the palace door to spy on and slander Empress Wang.

However, the situation came to a head in 654. Consort Wu had given birth to a daughter, and after birth, Empress Wang visited her. Shortly thereafter, the child was found dead, and the Empress Wang accused of murdering the girl. Consort Wu took this opportunity to convince Emperor Gaozong that Empress Wang had killed their daughter, with a view to get rid of Empress Wang (historians believe that Lady Wu's ambitions were such that she killed her daughter to oust Empress Wang).

In summer 655, Consort Wu accused Empress Wang and Lady Liu of using witchcraft to try to gain favor back for Empress Wang, and in response, Emperor Gaozong barred Lady Liu from the palace and exiled Liu Shi. Despite this, he did not immediately depose Empress Wang. In fall 655, he summoned the chancellors Zhangsun, Chu Suiliang, Li Ji, and Yu Zhining to the palace to discuss the matter—a meeting that Li Ji declined to attend. Chu fervently opposed deposing Empress Wang and pointed out that Consort Wu was previously Emperor Taizong's concubine and, therefore, taking her was considered incest. Two other chancellors not invited to the meeting, Han Yuan and Lai Ji, also submitted opposition. However, after Emperor Gaozong asked Li Ji for his opinion, Li Ji responded, "This is your family matter, Your Imperial Majesty. Why ask anyone else?" Emperor Gaozong thus became resolved to depose Empress Wang, and in winter 655—November 16—both Empress Wang and Consort Xiao were deposed and reduced to commoner rank. Their mothers and brothers were exiled to the modern Guangdong region, while Empress Wang's father Wang Renyou's posthumous honors were stripped.

== After removal ==
Six days after Empress Wang's removal, by order of the new Empress Wu, Empress Wang and Consort Xiao were put under arrest inside the palace, at a building that had its doors and windows tightly sealed, with only a hole on the wall to deliver food. One day, after the coronation of Empress Wu, Emperor Gaozong thought of them and decided to visit them, and when he saw the conditions they were in, he was saddened, calling out, "Empress, Shufei [Consort Xiao's title], where are you?" Empress Wang wept and responded, "We have been found guilty and reduced to be maidservants. How can we still be referred to by honored titles?" She also begged, "If Your Imperial Majesty considered our past relationships and will allow us to again see the light of day, please rename this place 'Huixin Courtyard' (回心院, meaning "the courtyard of a returned heart")."

Emperor Gaozong was initially receptive, responding, "I will do so right away." Allegedly, when Empress Wu heard this, she was enraged, and she issued their death warrants, and sent people to cane Empress Wang and Consort Xiao 100 times each and cut off their hands and feet. She then had them put into large wine jars, saying, "Let these two witches be drunk to their bones!" Empress Wang and Consort Xiao are said to have suffered for several days inside the wine jars before dying, and Empress Wu had their bodies taken out of the jars and beheaded. (Note: When Empress Wang was informed of the execution order, she is said to have bowed and stated, "May His Imperial Majesty live forever, and may Zhaoyi (昭儀, Empress Wu's title as a concubine, implicitly refusing to acknowledge her as empress) be favored forever. Dying is within my responsibility." However, Consort Xiao cursed Empress Wu, "Wu is a treacherous monster! May it be that I be reincarnated as a cat and she be reincarnated as a mouse, so that I can, for ever and ever, grab her throat." When Empress Wu heard of Consort Xiao's curse, she is said to have forbade the palace personnel from keeping cats as pets, and even ordered the banning of cats as pets in the capital, Chang'an, but thereafter often dreamed of Empress Wang and Consort Xiao, with scattered hair and bleeding limbs, seeking to kill her. She thereafter initially moved to Penglai Palace (蓬萊宮), but continued to dream of them, and therefore eventually spent most of her time in the eastern capital Luoyang and not in the capital Chang'an, where these events occurred.) Soon after Empress Wang's and Consort Xiao's deaths, at Empress Wu's urging, Emperor Gaozong also had Empress Wang's and her clan's surname changed to Mang (蟒, meaning "boa constrictor") and Consort Xiao's and her clan's surname changed to Xiao (梟, meaning "owl"). Only after Empress Wu's own death in 705 were their clans' proper surnames restored.

However, this account of their deaths is according to the New Book of Tang, meaning the later-edited history of Tang dynasty, was compiled in the Northern Song dynasty, which is around 400 years after the recorded time of Empress Wang and Consort Xiao's deaths. The Old Book of Tang, meaning the formerly-compiled history of Tang dynasty, was completed around 945 A.D. and contains less inaccurate information than its predecessor. Both of these compilations are several hundred years away from Empress Wang's, Consort Xiao's and Wu Zetian's active period. Notwithstanding, the Old Book of Tang also clearly states that Consort Xiao and Empress Wang were strangled to death, other than different tortures human beings could bear under ancient medical conditions. A much earlier history, Tang Huiyao (唐會要) (begun 8th century) records no such events. Therefore, historians in generations after the Song dynasty conclude that the strange story was adapted by editors of the early Song dynasty from the horrible deeds of Han dynasty's Empress Dowager Lü Zhi, in order to defame and demonize Wu, the only female emperor ever, and to restrain later empress dowagers' power. Empress Liu (劉娥 Liu E), the most powerful empress dowager in the Song dynasty, had similar life experience to Wu and wore imperial robes (emperor's outfit). The editors of the New Book of Tang coexisted with Liu E for a certain period. Apart from this, there are several discrepancies and inconsistencies in the New Book of Tang and the Old Book of Tang. A major example is the alleged affair between the Buddhist Monk Bianji and Princess Gaoyang mentioned in the New Book of Tang, however, the Old Book of Tang and other older sources records no such affair. This is due to the fact that the Song Dynasty scholars who complied the New Book of Tang and Zizhi Tongjian had Anti-Buddhist Neo-Confucian views and, due to the fact that Buddhism was also promoted by Wu Zetian during her reign. In recent years, even more inconsistencies and contradictions have appeared when unearthed epitaphs are compared with relevant history compilations. For instance and reference, some of the key content on the Epitaph of Shangguan Wan'er (上官婉兒墓志) go against relevant recordings. Therefore, Consort Xiao and Empress Wang were most likely strangled to death.

== Modern depictions ==
- Portrayed by Chang Chung Wen in the 1963 Hong-Kong movie Empress Wu Tse-Tien.
- Portrayed by Ban Ban in the 1984 Hong-Kong TV series Empress Wu.
- Portrayed by Chen Pei-ling in the 1985 Taiwanese TV series The Empress of the Dynasty.
- Portrayed by Zheng Shuang in the 1995 Chinese TV series Wu Zetian.
- Portrayed by Zhang Tong in the 2003 Chinese TV series Lady Wu: The First Empress.
- Portrayed by Yan Bingyan in the 2006 Chinese TV series Wu Zi Bei Ge.
- Portrayed by Jun Hyun-ah in 2006-2007 SBS TV series Yeon Gaesomun.
- Portrayed by Ni Hong Jie in the 2011 Chinese TV series Meng Hui Tang Chao.
- Portrayed by Zhou Mu Yin in the 2011 Chinese TV series Beauty World.
- Portrayed by Jiang Lin Jing in the 2011 TV series Secret History of Empress Wu.
- Portrayed by Lan Yan in the 2012 Chinese TV series Secret History of Princess Taiping.
- Portrayed by Shi Shi in the 2014 Chinese TV series The Empress of China.
- Portrayed by Hu Sang in the 2014 Chinese TV series Young Sherlock.
- Portrayed by Theresa Fu in the 2017 Chinese TV series Legendary Di Renjie.

Is a leading character in the historical novel "Green Dragon, White Tiger", where Empress Wang is known conversationally as Paulownia, a socially awkward girl whom Wu Zetian- known in the book as Black Jade - initially tries to help, but her attempts at a genuine friendship are hampered by the scheming Pure concubine.

== Notes ==
Chinese royalty
Preceded by Empress Zhangsun	Empress consort of the Tang dynasty 650 – 27 November 655	Succeeded by Empress Wu
