= Xu Hui =

Chinese poet

- Born: 627
- Died: 650 (aged 22–23)
- Spouse: Emperor Taizong of Tang
- Father: Xu Xiaode

Xu Hui (Chinese: 徐惠; 627–650) was a female Chinese poet, "the first of all women poets of the Tang, an individual scarcely even noted in traditional literary history... but the only one of the thirty-plus 'empresses and consorts'...given biographies in the official Tang histories to have any of her own writings quoted there."

Xu Hui was the child prodigy daughter of Xu Xiaode, from Changcheng in Huzhou (in modern Zhejiang province). She became a minor consort to the Tang dynasty's second emperor, Emperor Taizong of Tang. Although originally appointed as a fifth-rank court lady, a "Talented Lady" (cairen, 才人), she was later promoted to an imperial concubine status, as a "Replete of Mien" (Chongrong, 充容).

Xu Hui is one of China's outstanding early female poets, and is believed to have written around one thousand poems, but only five survive today, including the well-known "Regret in Changmen Palace" on the popular Tang dynasty topic of the neglected or abandoned lady. The poem refers to a specific historical incident when the Emperor Han Wudi's empress was "sequestered in the Tall Gate (changmen) Palace and feared she would be replaced in the sovereign's affections by a newer favorite". It reads, in partial English translation:

You used to love my Cypress Rafter Terrace,
But now you dote upon her Bright Yang Palace.
I know my place, take leave of your palanquin.
Hold in my feelings, weep for a cast-off fan.
There was a time my dances, songs, brought honor.
These letters and poems of long ago? Despised!
It's true, I think--your favor collapsed like waves.
Hard to offer water that's been spilled.

Tradition holds that on the Emperor Taizong's death, she became ill from grief, and died the following year. Taizong's successor Gaozong posthumously honored her with the title Xianfei (賢妃), and promoted her father on her account to be prefect of Guozhou. She was also given the privilege of satellite burial within Emperor Taizong's mausoleum, the Zhaoling.

== Media ==
- Portrayed by Janine Chang in the 2014 Chinese television series The Empress of China.
