= Han Yuan =

Han Yuan Duke of Yingchuan (潁川县公)
- 韓瑗

Chancellor of the Tang dynasty
- In office 652–657
- Monarch: Emperor Gaozong of Tang

Personal details
- Occupation: Official
- Known for: Chancellor under Emperor Gaozong; opposed elevation of Wu Zetian

Han Yuan (Chinese: 韓瑗; 606–659), courtesy name Boyu (伯玉), noble title Duke of Yingchuan (潁川县公), was an official of the Tang dynasty of China, serving as chancellor during the reign of Emperor Gaozong. He drew the ire of Emperor Gaozong by opposing the removal of Emperor Gaozong's first wife Empress Wang and replacement by his favorite concubine, Consort Wu (later known as Wu Zetian) and was exiled. He died in 659, just in advance of a wave of reprisals initiated by the new Empress Wu and her allies that would have resulted in his execution had he not died.

== Background ==
Han Yuan was born in 606, during the reign of Emperor Yang of Sui. His family was from the region of Sui's (and later its successor Tang's) capital Chang'an. His grandfather Han Shao (韓紹) served as deputy minister of husbandry during the Sui dynasty, and his father Han Zhongliang (韓仲良) served as deputy minister of justice during the reign of the Tang dynasty's founder Emperor Gaozu. For Han Zhongliang's contributions in revising the laws during Emperor Gaozu's reign, he was later promoted during the reign of Emperor Gaozu's son and successor Emperor Taizong to be minister of justice and was created the Duke of Yingchuan, a title that Han Yuan later inherited.

Han Yuan himself was described to be full of integrity and knowledge when he was young and was said to have skills fit for officials. During Emperor Taizong's reign, he inherited the title of Duke of Yingchuan from Han Zhongliang, and eventually served as deputy minister of defense.

== During Emperor Gaozong's reign ==
In 652, after Emperor Taizong had died in 649 and been succeeded by his son Li Zhi (as Emperor Gaozong). Han Yuan became acting Huangmen Shilang (黃門侍郎) -- the deputy head of the examination bureau of government (門下省, Menxia Sheng). He was also given the designation Tong Zhongshu Menxia Sanpin (同中書門下三品), making him a chancellor de facto. In 654, he was given the honorific title Yinqing Guanglu Daifu (銀青光祿大夫). In 655, he became Shizhong (侍中) -- the head of the examination bureau and a post considered one for a chancellor, and he was also made a staff member of Emperor Gaozong's son and crown prince Li Zhong.

By that point, Emperor Gaozong's favor for his wife Empress Wang had waned, and his favorite concubine was Consort Wu. Early in 655, he wanted to create Consort Wu, who carried the sixth highest rank among imperial consorts, Zhaoyi (昭儀), the unprecedented title of Chenfei (宸妃), and promoting her over all other imperial consorts directly under Empress Wang herself, but Han and fellow chancellor Lai Ji both opposed on the grounds that the title was unprecedented, and so Emperor Gaozong did not carry it out.

Later that year, Consort Wu falsely accused Empress Wang and her mother Lady Liu of using witchcraft to try to regain Emperor Gaozong's favor. Emperor Gaozong began discussions with the chancellors on deposing Empress Wang and replacing her with Consort Wu. The chancellors, other than the senior general Li Ji, who refused to render an opinion (but later also stated to Emperor Gaozong that it was his own business and that he needed not ask anyone else) and Emperor Gaozong's powerful uncle Zhangsun Wuji, who showed disapproval by silence, were largely vocal in their opposition, with the strongest opposition from Chu Suiliang. Meanwhile, Han also opposed the move, weeping bitterly during one meeting with Emperor Gaozong, causing Emperor Gaozong to remove him from the palace. He later further submitted a petition, pointing out that Empress Wang was the wife Emperor Taizong selected for Emperor Gaozong and was not known for faults. Emperor Gaozong did not listen and, after demoting Chu to be the commandant at Tan Prefecture (roughly modern Changsha, Hunan), in order to show the other chancellors what he was willing to do, deposed Empress Wang and replaced her with Consort Wu late in 655. (The former Empress Wang and her ally Consort Xiao were later executed cruelly at the instigation of the new Empress Wu.) One of the first things that the new empress did as empress was to submit a petition praising Han and Lai for their faithfulness and requesting that they be rewarded—a petition that, however, made Han and Lai apprehensive that she was aware of their opposition of her, and Han offered to resign thereafter, an offer that Emperor Gaozong did not accept.

In 656, Han nevertheless submitted a petition arguing on Chu's behalf, pointing how faithfully Chu had served both Emperor Gaozong and his father Emperor Taizong. After Han's petition, Emperor Gaozong summoned him and agreed with him that Chu was faithful but declined to recall Chu on the basis that Chu was disobedient. Han again offered to resign, and Emperor Gaozong again declined.

In 657, after Chu had been rotated to be the prefect of Gui Prefecture (桂州, roughly modern Guilin, Guangxi), Empress Wu's allies Xu Jingzong and Li Yifu accused Han and Lai of conspiring with Chu to rebel—accusing them moving to a prefecture of greater military importance than Tan Prefecture. Emperor Gaozong demoted both Han and Lai to be prefects of distance prefectures—in Han's case, Zhen Prefecture (振州, roughly modern Sanya, Hainan) -- and ordered that they not be allowed to visit the capital. (Chu and Empress Wang's uncle Liu Shi were similarly demoted.)

In 659, Empress Wu and her allies furthered the reprisals, this time accusing Zhangsun of plotting treason and accusing Han, Chu, and Liu of being part of the treasonous plot. Zhangsun was deposed and eventually forced to commit suicide. Chu, who had died in 658, was posthumously stripped of all his titles, while orders were sent out, initially for Han and Liu to be stripped of their titles, and then for their execution. Before the executioners could arrive, however, Han had already died. The executioners opened up his casket to make sure that it was his body inside, before returning to Chang'an. His assets were seized, and his family was exiled to the modern Guangdong and Guangxi region. In 705, after Empress Wu (who had, since that point, seized the throne herself with the title of "emperor" but had been overthrown earlier that year by her son Emperor Zhongzong) died, her will had provisions that restored Han's titles, although whether she wrote those provisions herself was debatable.
