= Suo Yuanli =

Chinese secret police official (died 691)

Suo Yuanli (traditional Chinese: 索元禮; simplified Chinese: 索元礼; pinyin: Sǔo Yuánlǐ; Cantonese Yale: su4 yun3 le) (died 691) was a secret police official during the Chinese Tang dynasty and Wu Zetian's Zhou dynasty, who came to prominence due to his cruelty in acting against officials that Wu Zetian was suspicious toward. However, when he became increasingly hated by the people, she executed him in order to placate the people.

Suo Yuanli was said to be non-Han in origin. In 684, when Wu Zetian, then empress dowager and regent over her son Emperor Ruizong, had just suppressed a rebellion against her led by Li Jingye the Duke of Ying, she began to encourage the people to submit secret report against others. When Suo heard about this, he submitted a secret report, and when he had the chance to meet her, she was impressed by him and gave him a general title but put him in charge of investigating officials suspected of opposing her. It was said that Suo was cruel and, whenever he investigated one person, he would find ways to get that person to implicate tens or hundreds of others. It was said that thousands of people died at Suo's hands. In 691, however, it was said that he was so despised that she, deciding to placate the people, executed him.
