= Li Yifu =

Chinese historian, poet, and politician

Li Yifu (Chinese: 李義府; 614–666) was a Chinese historian, poet, and politician who served as a chancellor of the Tang dynasty, during the reign of Emperor Gaozong. He became particularly powerful because of his support for Emperor Gaozong's second wife Empress Wu (later known as Wu Zetian) when her ascension was opposed by then-chancellors, and he had a reputation for treachery. He was also fully involved in the elimination of Empress Wu's political rivals and played an important role in it. In 663, on account of corruption, he was removed from his post and exiled. In 666, after Emperor Gaozong had declared a general pardon, except for the long-term exiles, Li Yifu died in anger.

== Background ==
Li Yifu was born in 614, during the reign of Emperor Yang of Sui, and his clan was originally from what would become Ying Prefecture (瀛州, part of modern Cangzhou, Hebei), but as his grandfather served as the secretary to the county magistrate of Shehong County (射洪, in modern Suining, Sichuan), his family stayed in the area thereafter. In 634, during the reign of Emperor Taizong of Tang, the official that Emperor Taizong sent to examine the region, Li Daliang, believing that Li Yifu was literarily capable, recommended him, and after an imperial examination, he served as a protocol officer at the examination bureau of government (門下省, Menxia Sheng). Liu Ji and Ma Zhou, two officials who were his supervisors (and who later served as chancellors), both praised him for his capability. Soon, he was made an assistant imperial censor and also made a member of the staff of Emperor Taizong's son Li Zhi the Prince of Jin. In 643, after Emperor Taizong deposed Li Zhi's older brother Li Chengqian the Crown Prince and replaced him with Li Zhi, Li Yifu continued to serve on Li Zhi's staff, and among his staff members, he and Lai Ji were particularly known for their literary talent. Li Zhi was particularly complimentary of his semi-lyrical essay Chenghua Zhen (承華箴), and submitted it to Emperor Taizong. Li Yifu, for his talent, was also ordered to participate in the editing of the Book of Jin, the official history that Emperor Taizong commissioned for the Jin dynasty.

== Rise to power ==
After Emperor Taizong's death in 649, Li Zhi became emperor (as Emperor Gaozong), and sometime thereafter, Li Yifu became a mid-level official at the legislative bureau (中書省, Zhongshu Sheng). In 651, he took on additional responsibilities of assisting in editing the imperial history.

Meanwhile, Emperor Gaozong's favor for his wife Empress Wang had been waning, and he particularly favored Consort Wu, who had designs on the empress position, and she falsely implicated Empress Wang in the killing of her daughter. By 655, Emperor Gaozong had wanted to depose Empress Wang and replace her with Consort Wu, but most of the chancellors were opposed. It happened at that time, the most powerful of the chancellors, Emperor Gaozong's uncle Zhangsun Wuji, who had not placed Li Yifu in high esteem, was set to send Li Yifu to Bi Prefecture (壁州, roughly modern Bazhong, Sichuan) to serve as the military advisor to the prefect. Li Yifu received the news in advance, and he requested advice from his colleague Wang Dejian (王德儉). Wang Dejian pointed out that Emperor Gaozong was favoring Consort Wu, and that if Li Yifu supported Consort Wu, his situation would be improved. Li Yifu agreed, and he submitted a petition to depose Empress Wang and replace her with Consort Wu. Emperor Gaozong and Consort Wu were pleased, and they promoted Li Yifu to be the assistant head of the legislative bureau. After Emperor Gaozong did depose Empress Wang and replace her with Consort Wu later that year, over the strenuous objections of the chancellors Chu Suiliang, Han Yuan, and Lai Ji and implicit disapproval of Zhangsun, Li Yifu was given the designation of Canzhi Zhengshi (參知政事), making him a chancellor de facto. He was also created the Baron of Guangping.

Traditional historians, when discussing Li Yifu's rise to power, stated that he appeared to be mild, humble, and respectful in his temperament, and he was often smiling, but in secret, he was full of treachery and machinations, and therefore, it was said that he had knives in his smile (this description gave rise to the chengyu 笑裡藏刀), and he was also referred to as "Cat Li" (李貓), referring to his insincere smiles.

In 656, after Empress Wu's son Li Hong was created crown prince, Li Yifu was given an additional post as Li Hong's assistant, and he was created the Marquess of Guangping. That year, he had heard that a Lady Chunyu, from the eastern capital Luoyang, was beautiful, and had been arrested for an offense and held in custody. Li Yifu had the secretary general of the supreme court, Bi Zhengyi (畢正義), improperly find her not guilty and release her, with the intent that he would then take Lady Chunyu as a concubine. When this improper release was noticed by the chief judge of the supreme court, Duan Baoxuan (段寶玄), Duan reported to Emperor Gaozong, and Li Yifu, in fear, forced Bi to commit suicide. The assistant imperial censor Wang Yifang (王義方) then submitted an accusation against Li Yifu, but offended Emperor Gaozong by using language that Emperor Gaozong found obscene—language that implied that because of Li Yifu's good looks, Liu Ji and Ma Zhou must have favored him after having sexual relations with him—and Wang was demoted to Lai Prefecture to serve as census officer, while Emperor Gaozong took no actions against Li Yifu.

Later in 656, with Chu having been demoted out of the capital, Li Yifu had Liu Ji's son Liu Hongye (劉弘業) submit a petition claiming that his father was forced to commit suicide after false accusations by Chu. (Liu Ji had been forced to commit suicide around the new year 646 due to accusations that he had planned to kill a number of high level officials disagreeing with him if Emperor Taizong had died from a serious illness that he was suffering from at the time.) However, after Le Yanwei pointed out that revisiting Liu Ji's case would imply that Emperor Taizong made improper decisions, Emperor Gaozong took no action on Liu Hongye's petition.

In 657, Li Yifu was made Zhongshu Ling (中書令), the head of the legislative bureau and an office considered one for a chancellor. He was also created the Duke of Hejian. Later that year, he, and another ally of Empress Wu's, Xu Jingzong, falsely accused Chu, Han, and Lai of conspiring to commit treason, and both Han and Lai (who were still chancellors) were demoted out of the capital to be prefects, while Chu and Empress Wang's uncle Liu Shi were demoted to be prefects of exceedingly distant prefectures.

== Removal and restoration ==
By 658, Li Yifu was said to be so powerful due to favors that Emperor Gaozong and Empress Wu showed him that even his young children were given official posts, and that his mother, wife, and sons were receiving bribes from officials to give them preferential treatment. His fellow chancellor Du Zhenglun, whose post was also Zhongshu Ling, had considered himself senior to Li Yifu and therefore was not willing to yield to Li Yifu, while Li Yifu was also not yielding to Du. The conflict between the two eventually erupted into an argument before Emperor Gaozong. Emperor Gaozong, rebuking both for their conflict, demoted both to be prefectural prefect—Du to Heng Prefecture (橫州, roughly modern Nanning, Guangxi), and Li Yifu to Pu Prefecture (普州, roughly modern Ziyang, Sichuan). (Du soon died at Heng Prefecture.)

Despite Li Yifu's demotion out of the capital, Empress Wu was still protecting him. Around the new year 659, Tang Lin (唐臨), the minister of civil service affairs, had submitted suggestions that Xu Hui (許褘) be made the examiner of the Jiangnan Circuit (江南道, region south of the Yangtze River) and Zhang Lun (張倫) be made the examiner of the Jiannan Circuit (劍南道, modern Sichuan, Chongqing, and Yunnan). The sensitive Empress Wu saw ulterior motives in this—because Xu was a friend of Lai Ji's, and Lai Ji's prefecture Tai Prefecture (臺州, roughly modern Taizhou, Zhejiang) was a part of Jiangnan Circuit, whereas Zhang was an enemy of Li Yifu's, and Li Yifu's Pu Prefecture was a part of Jiannan Circuit. As a result, she had Tang Jian removed from his post.

In fall 659, Emperor Gaozong recalled Li Yifu to the capital, to serve as the minister of civil service affairs and de facto chancellor. It was said that at this time Li Yifu carried out a revenge killing. Li Yifu's ancestors were originally from Hejian Commandery (河間, i.e., Cang Prefecture), but after he had become chancellor the first time, he claimed that his ancestors were actually from Zhao Commandery (趙郡, roughly modern Shijiazhuang, Hebei), as the Lis of Zhao Commandery, during Northern Wei and the subsequent dynasties, had been considered one of the most honored clans of the land. Many young officials from the Li clan, because they wanted Li Yifu's favor, therefore claimed to be in fact of the same clan as Li Yifu; one of these junior officials was one Li Chongde (李崇德), who listed Li Yifu in his family tree. When Li Yifu was demoted to Pu Prefecture, Li Chongde immediately removed Li Yifu from his family tree. When Li Yifu returned to the capital, he falsely accused Li Chongde of crimes, and Li Chongde committed suicide.

Later that year, Li Yifu, angry that he had previously sought to have his son married with a daughter of a traditionally prominent clan but had been unsuccessful in doing so, persuaded Emperor Gaozong that it was improper for these clans to be exclusive in their marriages and also demanding large amounts of dowry or bride price. Emperor Gaozong thus issued an edict forbidding the seven most prominent clans from marriage with each other and also limiting the amount of dowry and bride price they are permitted to receive.

In 661, Li Yifu's mother died, and he resigned to observe a period of mourning for her, but was recalled in 662 to again serve as minister of civil service affairs and chancellor de facto. He soon received permission to rebury his grandfather near the tomb of Emperor Gaozong's great-great-grandfather Li Hu (李虎), and it was said that he conscripted seven counties' laborers for the task and that the reburial was so grand that no burial since the founding of the Tang dynasty could rival it.

== Final downfall ==
In 663, Li Yifu was made the head of the legislative bureau (by now known as You Xiang (右相)), but continued to be in charge of civil service. He was also made the secretary for Emperor Gaozong's (and Empress Wu's) youngest son Li Xulun (the later Emperor Ruizong). However, it was said that Li Yifu actually lacked talent for selecting officials, and instead generally ranked officials simply based on the bribes they gave him, drawing discontent from the officials. Eventually, Emperor Gaozong heard about this, and on one occasion, still calmly stated to Li Yifu: "Your sons and sons-in-law are careless, and they have committed many unlawful acts. I was forced to cover for you. You should be careful." Li Yifu unhappily responded, "Who told Your Imperial Majesty?" Emperor Gaozong responded, "If I am correct, why do you want me to tell you who the informant is?" Li Yifu did not apologize but instead walked out, drawing Emperor Gaozong's displeasure.

Meanwhile, an astrologer Li Yifu trusted, Du Yuanji (杜元紀), informed him that there was an aura of imprisonment at his house, and that he could only suppress it by a large store of money. Li Yifu believed Du and redoubled his corruption. When this, in addition to Li Yifu's and Du's observations of auras, as well as Li Yifu's extortion of money from Zhangsun Wuji's grandson Zhangsun Yan (長孫延), were reported by the low-level official Yang Xingying (楊行穎), Emperor Gaozong ordered that Li Yifu be arrested, and then had the minister of justice Liu Xiangdao, as well as the imperial censor and the chief justice of the supreme court, investigate, reporting their findings to the chancellor Li Ji. Li Yifu was found guilty, removed from his posts, and exiled to Xi Prefecture (巂州, roughly modern Liangshan Yi Autonomous Prefecture, Sichuan). His sons and sons-in-law were also exiled.

In 666, Emperor Gaozong offered sacrifices to heaven and earth at Mount Tai and, to celebrate the occasion, declared a general pardon—but specifically exempted from the general pardon anyone who was given a long-term exile. Li Yifu, in anger and fear, died of an illness. His wife and children were not allowed to return to the eastern capital Luoyang until 674. In 692, after Empress Wu had seized the throne from her son Emperor Ruizong and took the title of emperor for her own, she, in recognition of how Li Yifu and five other officials had supported her, posthumously awarded Li Yifu the title of commandant of Yang Prefecture, but the posthumous honor was again stripped in 710 after Emperor Ruizong returned to the throne.
