= Zhangsun Wuji =

Chinese politician of the Tang dynasty (594-659)

Zhangsun Wuji 長孫無忌
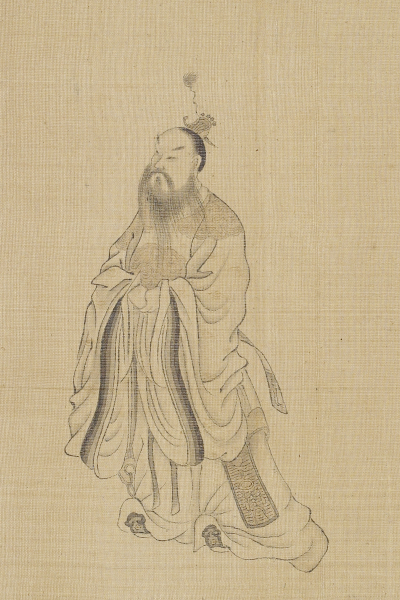
- Portrait of Zhangsun Wuji
- Born: Unknown; Luoyang, Henan
- Died: 659; Chongqing
- Other names: Fuji (輔機); Duke of Zhao (趙公)
- Occupation: Politician
- Children: Zhangsun Chong; Zhangsun Huan; Zhangsun Jun; Zhangsun Yan; Zhangsun Zhān; Zhangsun Jing; Zhangsun Xu; Zhangsun Zhàn; Zhangsun Jin; Zhangsun Ze; Zhangsun Run
- Father: Zhangsun Sheng
- Relatives: Empress Zhangsun (sister)

Zhangsun Wuji (Chinese: 長孫無忌; died 659), courtesy name Fuji (輔機), formally the Duke of Zhao, was a Chinese politician who served as a chancellor in the early Tang dynasty. He was Empress Zhangsun's brother, which made him a brother-in-law of Emperor Taizong (Li Shimin) and a maternal uncle of Emperor Gaozong (Li Zhi). He was an important advisor to Li Shimin when the latter was still the Prince of Qin during the reign of his father, Emperor Gaozu (Li Yuan). He helped Li Shimin overcome his brothers Li Jiancheng (the Crown Prince) and Li Yuanji (the Prince of Qi) in a succession struggle at the Xuanwu Gate Incident, eventually enabling Li Shimin to become the heir apparent and later the emperor. He was also instrumental in Emperor Taizong's selection of Li Zhi as the Crown Prince, and was exceedingly powerful after Li Zhi took the throne as Emperor Gaozong. However, he gradually fell out of his nephew's favour by failing to support Emperor Gaozong's decision to depose his first wife, Empress Wang, and replacing her with Empress Wu, especially after the beginning of the new year 657 with the power of Empress Wu fell more. In 659, Zhangsun Wuji was falsely accused of treason by Empress Wu's political ally, Xu Jingzong, and eventually ordered to be sent into exile by Emperor Gaozong. Xu Jingzong subsequently sent the official Yuan Gongyu (袁公瑜) to force Zhangsun Wuji to commit suicide on his way to exile.

== Early life ==
It is not known when Zhangsun Wuji was born, but what is known is that he was older than his sister, the future Empress Zhangsun, who was born in 601. It was written that his ancestors traced their origin to the Xianbei dynasty Northern Wei's founding emperor Emperor Taiwu of Northern Wei's 17th generation ancestor Tuoba Kuaili (拓跋儈立)—that their ancestor was Tuoba Kuali's third son, who took the surname Baba (拔拔), eventually changed to Zhangsun when Emperor Xiaowen of Northern Wei changed Xianbei surnames to Han surnames in 496. (Note: Zhangsun Wuji's biography in the Old Book of Tang actually wrote that the Zhangsuns traced their ancestry to the "third older brother of Emperor Xianwen of Northern Wei." See Old Book of Tang, vol. 65. However, this appeared to be in error, as Emperor Xianwen was the oldest son of his father, Emperor Wencheng of Northern Wei, and thus could not have had a third older brother. Based on the Book of Wei, the reference appeared to be intended to "the third older brother of Emperor Xian of Northern Wei," Emperor Xian being the posthumous honor conferred by Emperor Taiwu on Tuoba Kuali's son and successor Tuoba Linli (拓跋鄰立). See Book of Wei, vols. 1, 113.) (Note: The biography of Zhangsun's uncle Zhangsun Chi in Book of Sui recorded that he (and by extension his brother, Zhangsun Sheng) were great-grandsons of Zhangsun Zhi; Zhangsun Zhi has a biography in vol.25 of Book of Wei, and vol.22 of History of the Northern Dynasties (where he was renamed "You" due to his name sounding similar to Emperor Gaozong's real name).)

His father was the Sui dynasty general Zhangsun Sheng (長孫晟), and his mother was Zhangsun Sheng's wife Lady Gao, the daughter of the official Gao Jingde (高敬德). He had at least three older brothers—Zhangsun Sheng's oldest son Zhangsun Xingbu (長孫行布, who was killed in 604 while resisting the rebellion of Emperor Yang of Sui's brother Yang Liang the Prince of Han), Zhangsun Heng'an (長孫恆安), and Zhangsun Anye (長孫安業). (Empress Zhangsun was also born of Lady Gao, while Zhangsun Anye was not; who Zhangsun Xingbu's and Zhangsun Heng'an's mothers were was not recorded in history.) Zhangsun Sheng died in 609, and Zhangsun Anye, instead of raising his younger brother and sister, expelled them, as well as his stepmother Lady Gao, from the Zhangsun household and sent them back to Lady Gao's brother Gao Shilian, and Gao Shilian raised them.

It was said that Zhangsun Wuji was studious, and that he was both intelligent and full of strategies. When his sister later married Li Shimin, the second son of the general Li Yuan, he and Li Shimin became great friends. When Li Yuan, at Li Shimin's instigation, rose against the rule of Emperor Yang of Sui in 617 and attacked the capital Chang'an, Zhangsun Wuji went to meet Li Shimin, then serving as a major general of his father's, and he began to serve on Li Shimin's staff, often following Li Shimin on various campaigns.

== During Emperor Gaozu's reign ==
Li Yuan captured Chang'an in winter 617 and declared Emperor Yang's grandson Yang You emperor (as Emperor Gong), taking power himself as regent. After he received news in spring 618 that Emperor Yang had been killed at Jiangdu (江都, in modern Yangzhou, Jiangsu) in a coup led by the general Yuwen Huaji, he had Yang You yield the throne to him, establishing Tang dynasty as its Emperor Gaozu. Li Shimin was created the Prince of Qin and thereafter became the main general in charge of his father's campaigns to reunify China under Tang rule, which was largely complete by 623, when the last major rival to Tang, Liu Heita the Prince of Handong, was captured and killed by Li Shimin's older brother, Li Jiancheng the Crown Prince. For Zhangsun Wuji's contributions to Li Shimin's campaigns, he was created the Duke of Shangdang.

=== Incident at Xuanwu Gate ===
By 623, however, Li Shimin was locked into an intense rivalry with Li Jiancheng, who was supported by another brother, Li Yuanji the Prince of Qi. For the next several years, the rivalry further intensified. By 626, Li Jiancheng and Li Yuanji, apprehensive that Li Shimin might act against them, had falsely accused Li Shimin's staff strategists Fang Xuanling and Du Ruhui and military officer Yuchi Gong and had them removed from Li Shimin's staff. It was said that by that time, of Li Shimin's closest confidants, only Zhangsun remained, and that Zhangsun, his uncle Gao Shilian, Hou Junji, and Yuchi advocated acting first against Li Jiancheng and Li Yuanji. They persuaded Li Shimin to take action. Li Shimin thereafter set up an ambush for Li Jiancheng and Li Yuanji, killing them at Xuanwu Gate, and then effectively forced Emperor Gaozu to create him crown prince. Zhangsun was thereafter made the minister of civil service affairs. Two months later, Emperor Gaozu yielded the throne to Li Shimin, who took the throne as Emperor Taizong.

== During Emperor Taizong's reign ==
Late in 626, when Emperor Taizong personally ranked the contributions of the generals and officials in order to grant them fiefs, Emperor Taizong ranked five of them—Zhangsun Wuji, Fang Xuanling, Du Ruhui, Yuchi Gong, and Hou Junji to be contributors of the highest grade, and Zhangsun was created the Duke of Qi. As Zhangsun was both a great contributor to his victory and a close relative, Emperor Taizong was particularly close to him, allowing Zhangsun to enter the palace frequently.

In spring 627, when the general Li Yi, an associate of Li Jiancheng's, rebelled at Bin Prefecture (豳州, in modern Xianyang, Shaanxi), Emperor Taizong sent Zhangsun to engage Li Yi, although before Zhangsun could arrive, Li Yi had been defeated by his own subordinates and killed in flight. In fall 627, Emperor Taizong, despite opposition from Empress Zhangsun (who feared that the Zhangsun clan was becoming overly honored and would become a target of attack), Emperor Taizong made Zhangsun Wuji Puye (僕射), one of the heads of the important executive bureau of the government and a post considered one for a chancellor. Later that year, when Emperor Taizong heard that Eastern Tujue's Jiali Khan Ashina Duobi, who had made a deep incursion to Chang'an when Emperor Taizong first took the throne in 626, was having internal problems with his subordinates, he consulted Zhangsun and Xiao Yu, asking for their opinions. Xiao advocated an attack on Eastern Tujue, but Zhangsun pointed out that the peace treaty between the two states should not be breached, and Emperor Taizong accepted his suggestion.

Many officials were critical of Zhangsun Wuji's ascension to a chancellor post, and there were secret accusations made to Emperor Taizong that Zhangsun was monopolizing power. Emperor Taizong publicly declared confidence in Zhangsun, but he himself feared that he was a target of resentment. He repeatedly offered to resign, both directly and through Empress Zhangsun, and in spring 628, Emperor Taizong accepted the resignation, although he conferred on Zhangsun the honorific position of Kaifu Yitong Sansi (開府儀同三司) and continued to consult Zhangsun on many important matters. In 633, Emperor Taizong conferred on Zhangsun the even greater honor of Sikong (司空): one of the Three Excellencies.

In 637, a major revision of the Sui penal laws, led by Fang but assisted by Zhangsun, was completed, with 500 sections dividing the punishments into 20 grades. About 1,600 sections of regulations to implement the laws were also written.

Also in 637, as part of Emperor Taizong's scheme to bestow prefectures on his relatives and great generals and officials as their permanent domains, Zhangsun's title was changed to Duke of Zhao, and he was given the post of prefect of Zhao Prefecture (趙州, roughly modern Shijiazhuang, Hebei), to be inherited by his heirs. Many officials opposed the plan, with the strongest opposition coming from Zhangsun, who also had his daughter-in-law, Princess Changle (Emperor Taizong's daughter) submit oppositions on his behalf as well, and Emperor Taizong cancelled the scheme, although Zhangsun's title remained Duke of Zhao. In 642, Emperor Taizong changed Zhangsun's honorific from Sikong to Situ (司徒). In 643, when Emperor Taizong commissioned the Portraits at Lingyan Pavilion to commemorate the 24 great contributors to Tang rule, Zhangsun's was one of the portraits commissioned—indeed, Zhangsun's portraits was ranked first.

=== Succession dispute ===
Later in 643, Li Chengqian the Crown Prince (the oldest son of Emperor Taizong and Empress Zhangsun, who had died in 636), locked into an intense rivalry with his younger brother Li Tai the Prince of Wei, who was also born of Empress Zhangsun and was Emperor Taizong's favorite son, was discovered to have plotted to overthrow Emperor Taizong, along with Hou Junji and Emperor Taizong's sons-in-law Zhao Jie (趙節) and Du He (杜荷, Du Ruhui's son). Emperor Taizong put the investigation in the hands of Zhangsun, Fang Xuanling, Xiao Yu, Li Shiji, and the officials in charge of the supreme court and the legislative and examination bureaus of government, and they determined that, indeed, Li Chengqian had plotted to overthrow Emperor Taizong. Li Chengqian was deposed, while his coconspirators were executed.

A succession question immediately arose. Li Tai was Emperor Taizong's favorite son, and Emperor Taizong almost immediately promised to him that he would be created crown prince, an idea concurred by the chancellors Cen Wenben and Liu Ji. However, Zhangsun did not concur, and instead recommended that Emperor Taizong make his ninth son Li Zhi, also by Empress Zhangsun, crown prince instead; Zhangsun was supported in this suggestion by Chu Suiliang. Further, when Emperor Taizong interrogated Li Chengqian personally, Li Chengqian admitted guilt but blamed Li Tai's machinations for leading him to fear for his own safety and thus plot rebellion. Emperor Taizong thereafter resolved to create Li Zhi crown prince—a decision that he initially secretly informed only Zhangsun, Fang, Li Shiji, and Chu, in addition to Li Zhi himself—and he exiled both Li Chengqian and Li Tai. Subsequently, Zhangsun, along with Fang and Xiao, were made senior advisors to the new crown prince. Thereafter, however, Emperor Taizong began to doubt whether his decision was correct—believing that while Li Zhi was kind, he was also weak in personality, and unsure whether he would be fit to be emperor. He discussed with Zhangsun the possibility of making another son, Li Ke the Prince of Wu (by his concubine Consort Yang, a daughter of Sui's Emperor Yang), who was older than Li Zhi and considered more capable, crown prince instead. Zhangsun strenuously opposed this idea, and Emperor Taizong did not carry it out. Zhangsun further often praised Li Zhi's kindness. Thereafter, a deep enmity developed between Zhangsun and Li Ke.

In 644, when Emperor Taizong, at an imperial gathering, stated to his key officials their strengths and weaknesses, he spoke, with regard to Zhangsun:

Zhangsun Wuji is overly worried about appearance of conflict of interest. He is dexterious and decisive beyond the wisdom of the ancients, but commanding an army in the battlefield is not his strength.

=== Goguryeo–Tang War ===
Later in 644, when Emperor Taizong launched a major attack against Goguryeo, he had the generals Li Shiji and Li Daozong lead the forward forces, while commanding the main forces himself, assisted by Zhangsun, Cen, and Yang Shidao. In summer 645, at a major battle against the main Goguryeo forces commanded by the generals Go Yeonsu (高延壽) and Go Hyezin (高惠真) engaged Tang forces, Emperor Taizong had Li Shiji command 15,000 men to serve as decoy, and when Goguryeo forces attacked Li Shiji, Zhangsun Wuji attacked them from behind with 11,000 men, and Li Shiji and Zhangsun, as well as Emperor Taizong himself, defeated Goguryeo forces, forcing their surrender. He then considered directly attacking Goguryeo's capital Pyongyang itself, but Li Shiji believed that if Ansi (安市, in modern Anshan, Liaoning) was not captured first, the general in command of Ansi (a capable general known in Korean popular legends as Yang Manch'un, although whether that was his real name is unknown), might attack Tang forces from the rear. Emperor Taizong agreed, and therefore put Ansi under siege again. However, the commander at Ansi was a capable defender, and the resolve of the defenders was strengthened when Li Shiji, in anger, declared that after the fall of the city all residents would be slaughtered. With the Tang forces bogged down in sieging Ansi, a number of officials suggested skipping past Ansi and attacking Ogol (烏骨, in modern Dandong, Liaoning) and then head toward Pyongyang. Zhangsun opposed, believing the strategy to be too risky without first capturing Ansi and Geonan (建安, in modern Yingkou, Liaoning) first. Emperor Taizong agreed and continued sieging Ansi, but still could not capture it. In fall 645, with winter approaching, Emperor Taizong was forced to withdraw. (The Song dynasty historian Hu Sanxing, the commentator to the Zizhi Tongjian, commented that overcautiousness was what cost Emperor Taizong the victory, indirectly blaming Zhangsun for opposing the strategy to attack Pyongyang directly.) As the army retreated, Zhangsun was responsible for building a temporary bridge over the Liao River to allow the army to cross.

In 647, when Zhangsun's uncle Gao Shilian died, Emperor Taizong, who had just recently himself recovered from an illness, wanted to attend Gao's wake, but Zhangsun lay down in the path of his horse, blocking him, reasoning that as someone who had recently recovered, it was inappropriate for Emperor Taizong to attend the wake. Emperor Taizong, due to Zhangsun's opposition, relented. In summer 647, Emperor Taizong made Zhangsun the commandant at Yang Prefecture (i.e., Jiangdu), but did not actually send him to Yang Prefecture. In fall 647, when a commoner named Duan Zhichong (段志沖) submitted a petition to Emperor Taizong, asking him to yield the throne to Li Zhi, Li Zhi became concerned that Emperor Taizong would suspect that the proposal came from him, and Zhangsun requested that Duan be executed. Emperor Taizong, however, was unfazed, and took no actions against Duan.

In spring 648, Emperor Taizong made Zhangsun the acting head of the legislative bureau—also a chancellor post—and further gave instructions that he also be in charge of the other two main bureaus of government, the executive and the examination bureaus, effectively putting Zhangsun in command of all of the government.

In summer 649, Emperor Taizong was seriously ill, while at the summer palace Cuiwei Palace (翠微宮). He summoned Zhangsun and Chu to his bedside and entrusted Li Zhi to them. He soon died, and by Zhangsun's orders, his death was kept a secret until his casket, accompanied by Li Zhi, was returned to Chang'an. Li Zhi then took the throne (as Emperor Gaozong).

== During Emperor Gaozong's reign ==
After Emperor Gaozong took the throne, he changed Zhangsun's honorific title to Taiwei (太尉), also one of the Three Excellencies, and ordered that he continued to be in charge of all three bureaus, although Zhangsun declined the responsibility over the executive bureau. Emperor Gaozong also gave him the chancellor de facto designation of Tong Zhongshu Menxia Sanpin (同中書門下三品). Early in Emperor Gaozong's reign, it was said that, while there were other men with chancellor designations, Zhangsun Wuji and Chu Suiliang controlled the government, but that they served faithfully and were extending the efficient governance that Emperor Taizong instituted during his "Reign of Zhen'guan." However, perhaps challenging Zhangsun's authority and/or faithfulness, the Tufan king Songtsän Gampo wrote a letter to Zhangsun, stating, "The Son of Heaven has just taken the throne. If there are unfaithful subjects among the officials, I will lead an army to the capital to destroy them." However, Emperor Gaozong trusted both Zhangsun and Chu greatly, and in 650, when a commoner named Li Hongtai (李弘泰) accused Zhangsun of treason, Emperor Gaozong had Li Hongtai immediately beheaded.

In 651, another revision of the laws, with Zhangsun in charge, was completed, and was promulgated by Emperor Gaozong.

In 652, with Emperor Gaozong's wife Empress Wang being sonless, her uncle Liu Shi, also a chancellor, suggested to her that she propose that Emperor Gaozong's oldest son, Li Zhong, whose mother Consort Liu was of low birth, be made crown prince, believing that Li Zhong would be grateful to her. Liu Shi also lobbied Zhangsun to make the request for her. Emperor Gaozong agreed, and in fall 652 created Li Zhong crown prince.

Late in 652, there was a major dispute between Fang Xuanling's oldest son and heir Fang Yizhi (房遺直) and his younger brother Fang Yi'ai (房遺愛), as well as Fang Yi'ai's wife, Emperor Taizong's daughter Princess Gaoyang. Princess Gaoyang accused Fang Yizhi of assaulting her, while Fang Yizhi accused Fang Yi'ai and Princess Gaoyang of treason. Emperor Gaozong ordered Zhangsun to investigate, and Zhangsun discovered that Fang Yi'ai, Princess Gaoyang, the general Xue Wanche (薛萬徹), and another brother-in-law of Emperor Gaozong's, Chai Lingwu (柴令武), had considered to support Emperor Taizong's younger brother Li Yuanjing (李元景) the Prince of Jing as emperor. Fang Yi'ai, knowing that Zhangsun had long wanted to kill Li Ke, whom he viewed as a threat to Emperor Gaozong's throne, falsely implicated Li Ke in the plot as well, hoping that Zhangsun would spare him. Zhangsun, however, used this opportunity to carry out a purge—and in spring 653, Zhangsun persuaded Emperor Gaozong to issue an edict executing Fang Yi'ai, Xue, and Chai, while ordering Li Yuanjing, Li Ke, and Princesses Gaoyang and Baling (Chai's wife) to commit suicide. Further, Zhangsun also had the chancellor Yuwen Jie (a friend of Fang Yi'ai's), Li Daozong (who had long had a rivalry with Zhangsun and Chu), and the general Zhishi Sili (執失思力), Xue's brother Xue Wanbei (薛萬備) as well as Li Ke's mother Consort Yang and Consort Yang's younger son Li Yin, reduced to commoner rank and exiled. (For these actions, he was heavily criticized by Liu Xu, the lead editor of the Old Book of Tang, who commented that perhaps it was karmic that eventually Zhangsun himself would be falsely accused. Indeed, when Li Ke died, he cursed Zhangsun, stating: "Zhangsun Wuji has stolen imperial power and falsely accused the faithful. The imperial ancestral spirits are watching. Soon your own clan will be slaughtered.")

=== Downfall ===
By 654, Emperor Gaozong had become enamored with Consort Wu—whom he had, against Confucian definitions of incest, taken as a concubine even though she had been a concubine of Emperor Taizong's. (Empress Wang, who had been jealous of Emperor Gaozong's then-favorite concubine Consort Xiao, had suggested that he take Consort Wu as a concubine, in order to divide Consort Xiao's favors, but as Emperor Gaozong's favors became exclusively concentrated on Consort Wu, she turned to ally with Consort Xiao against Consort Wu, to no avail.) In 654, after Consort Wu's infant daughter died, Emperor Gaozong began considering deposing Empress Wang and replacing her with Consort Wu. (Historians have suggested that Consort Wu murdered her own daughter in order to frame the Empress; however, there is no evidence that the infant was actually murdered, and could have died from natural causes). However, Gaozong feared opposition from the high level officials. He visited Zhangsun's mansion along with Consort Wu, bestowing lavish gifts on Zhangsun and making Zhangsun's three sons mid-level officials, and used the opportunity to bring up the topic of replacing Empress Wang with Consort Wu. Zhangsun pretended not to understand and took no actions to endorse Consort Wu, and persisted in this stand despite later lobbying by both Consort Wu's mother Lady Yang and fellow chancellor Xu Jingzong. However, soon, Xu, Li Yifu (who became chancellor over his overt support for Consort Wu), as well as other key officials Cui Yixuan (崔義玄) and Yuan Gongyu, formed an alliance in support of Consort Wu.

In fall 655, after an imperial gathering, Emperor Gaozong summoned Zhangsun, Li Ji (Note: I.e., Li Shiji—he had dropped the character "Shi" by this point on Emperor Gaozong's orders that naming taboo was to be observed as to the characters "Shi" and "Min", not just the sequence "Shimin" as Emperor Taizong had ordered), Chu, and Yu Zhining to the palace—an order that Chu correctly guessed was intended to call them into a meeting in which he would try to persuade them to agree with his desire to replace Empress Wang with Consort Wu. Li Ji declined to enter. When Zhangsun, Chu, and Yu attended the meeting, Emperor Gaozong did indeed propose to replace Empress Wang with Consort Wu. While Chu objected strenuously, Zhangsun and Yu did not speak but showed no approval. Later, fellow chancellors Han Yuan and Lai Ji also showed opposition, but when Emperor Gaozong asked Li Ji, Li Ji responded, "This is your family matter, Your Imperial Majesty. Why ask anyone else?" Emperor Gaozong, after demoting Chu to a commandant post at Tan Prefecture (roughly modern Changsha, Hunan), deposed Empress Wang and Consort Xiao to commoner rank and created Consort Wu as empress to replace Empress Wang. (Note: Soon, by Empress Wu's orders, the former Empress Wang and Consort Xiao were tortured and killed.)

=== Death and posthumous developments ===
By the beginning of 657, the power of Empress Wu and her allies was so great that they began to retaliate hard against the authorities who opposed them. By 659, Empress Wu's position was secure, and she resented how Zhangsun and Yu had shown implicit disapproval of her ascension—and Xu, who had been repeatedly rebuked by Zhangsun over this matter, also resented Zhangsun. Xu thereafter, when investigating a report of factionalism by the low level officials Wei Jifang (韋季方) and Li Chao (李巢), manufactured evidence that Zhangsun had plotted treason with them. Emperor Gaozong wanted to interrogate Zhangsun personally, but at Xu's suggestion—pointing out that Zhangsun had been experienced at quick reactions as demonstrated by his achievements—in summer 659, suddenly stripped Zhangsun's posts and fief, and while he officially gave Zhangsun the title of commandant at Yang Prefecture, he instead exiled Zhangsun to Qian Prefecture (黔州, modern southeastern Chongqing) under house arrest. Zhangsun's sons were also exiled. In fall 659, Emperor Gaozong further reopened the investigations, putting Li Ji, Xu, Xin Maojiang, Ren Yaxiang, and Lu Chengqing in charge of investigating the alleged plot. Xu took this opportunity to send Yuan Gongyu to Qian Prefecture, where Yuan by order of Empress Wu forced Zhangsun to commit suicide. His wealth was confiscated. (Note: As part of the same reprisal transactions, Empress Wang's uncle Liu Shi was also executed in exile. Members of the Zhangsun and Liu households, as well as those of Han's, were forced into hard labor, while several relatives of Zhangsun's were also executed.) Later in Emperor Gaozong's reign, in 674, Emperor Gaozong restored Zhangsun's titles posthumously and allowed Zhangsun's great-grandson Zhangsun Yi (長孫翼) to inherit the title of Duke of Zhao. He also had Zhangsun's casket returned to Chang'an, to be buried near Emperor Taizong's tomb.
