= Chu Suiliang =

Chinese Tang dynasty calligrapher, historian, and politician

Chu Suiliang 褚遂良
- Born: 596; Hangzhou, Zhejiang, Sui China
- Died: 658 (aged 61–62); Thanh Hóa, Annan, Tang China
- Other names: Dengshan (登善); Duke of Henan (河南公)
- Occupations: Calligrapher, historian, politician
- Children: Chu Yanfu; Chu Yanchong; Chu Yanji
- Father: Chu Liang

Chǔ Suìliáng (596–658), courtesy name Dengshan, formally the Duke of Henan, was a Chinese calligrapher, historian, and politician who served as a chancellor during the reigns of the emperors Taizong and Gaozong in the Tang dynasty. He became increasingly trusted by Emperor Taizong toward the end of his reign and was charged with the responsibilities of serving as the imperial historian and providing honest advice. After Emperor Taizong's death, Chu was entrusted with the responsibilities of assisting Emperor Gaozong, along with Emperor Gaozong's maternal uncle, Zhangsun Wuji and early in the reign of the young emperor, he and Zhangsun Wuji gained great powers. In 655, over his strenuous opposition to Emperor Gaozong's removal of his first wife, Empress Wang, and replacing her with Empress Wu (later known as Wu Zetian), Chu was demoted, and that began a series of demotions, which was successfully launched by Empress Wu. Eventually, he was appointed as the prefect of Ai Prefecture (愛州, roughly modern Thanh Hóa Province, Vietnam). He died in exile in 658.

== Background ==
Chu Suiliang was born in Hangzhou in 596, during the reign of Emperor Wen in the Sui dynasty. His father, Chu Liang (褚亮), had been a mid-level official during both the Chen and Sui dynasties, and was known for his literary abilities. After Emperor Wen's death in 604, Chu Liang continued to serve Emperor Wen's son, Emperor Yang, but Emperor Yang was jealous of his abilities, and when the general Yang Xuangan rebelled in 613 and was quickly defeated, he accused Chu Liang of being friendly with Yang Xuangan and demoted him to be the census official for the distant Xihai Commandery (西海, in modern Haibei Tibetan Autonomous Prefecture, Qinghai). Chu Suiliang followed his father there.

In 617, when the agrarian rebel leader Xue Ju rose against Sui rule and declared himself the Emperor of Qin, Chu Liang and Chu Suiliang both joined Xue's administration. Chu Liang became a mid-level official, while Chu Suiliang became a low-level official. After Xue Ju's death in 618, his son and successor Xue Rengao was defeated by the Tang dynasty prince Li Shimin (the second son of Tang's founding emperor, Emperor Gaozu). Li Shimin spared Chu Liang and Chu Suiliang, and Chu Liang joined Li Shimin's staff, while Chu Suiliang remained at Qin Prefecture (秦州, roughly modern Tianshui, Gansu) to serve on the staff of the commandant at Qin Prefecture. His activities thereafter, until 636, were not recorded in history, although it was mentioned that he was well-studied in literature and history, and was a talented calligrapher, drawing praise from his father's friend Ouyang Xun, himself a famous calligrapher.

== During Emperor Taizong's reign ==
By 636, when Li Shimin had been emperor for 10 years (as Emperor Taizong), Chu Suiliang was serving as a low-level official in the imperial archival bureau, when he was put in charge of recording Emperor Taizong's acts for historical records. In 640, after Emperor Taizong sent the general Hou Junji to conquer Gaochang, both Chu and Wei submitted petitions requesting that, rather than annexing Gaochang, Emperor Taizong should reestablish Gaochang as a vassal kingdom—advice that Emperor Taizong did not accept but would regret later. (This appeared to, however, begin a pattern where Chu would often offer honest advice to Emperor Taizong, which he often, but not always, accepted, but always respected, and Chu's role in this capacity began particularly more important after Wei's death in spring 643, as Wei had been instrumental in advising Emperor Taizong as to what he was doing properly and what he was doing improperly, for most of Emperor Taizong's reign.)

In 641, Emperor Taizong was preparing to carry out grand ceremonies at Mount Tai in 642 to sacrifice to the gods of heaven and earth. At the suggestions of Xue Yi (薛頤) and Chu, however, he cancelled those plans. He also bestowed on Chu the title of imperial advisor, but continued to have Chu serve as the recorder of his acts. Once, When Emperor Taizong wanted to review the imperial historical records that Chu was responsible for keeping, Chu rebuffed Emperor Taizong, stating that it would be irregular for an emperor to look at how an imperial historian was writing about him. Emperor Taizong then made the comment, "Do you record the bad things I do as well?" Chu responded, "It is my responsibility, and I would not dare not to record them." The chancellor Liu Ji then stated, "Even if Chu Suiliang does not record them, everyone will." Emperor Taizong agreed with both of them. In 642, when Chu was troubled by the fact that Emperor Taizong was overly favoring his son Li Tai, the Prince of Wei, over Li Tai's elder brother Li Chengqian, the Crown Prince, Chu pointed out that an emperor to overly favor sons other than heirs would have the undesirable effect of causing people to speculate as to who should succeed the emperor. Emperor Taizong gave oral approval of his advice, but did not follow it. In the subsequent months, Chu would repeatedly remind Emperor Taizong of this issue, but Emperor Taizong, while repeatedly informing his officials that he had no intent to displace Li Chengqian with Li Tai, was unable to stop the government from factionalizing into Li Chengqian's supporters and Li Tai's supporters.

in 643, Li Chengqian, apprehensive that he might be replaced by Li Tai, conspired with Hou, his brothers-in-law Zhao Jie (趙節) and Du He (杜荷), and his uncle Li Yuanchang (李元昌), the Prince of Han, to overthrow Emperor Taizong. The plot was discovered, and Emperor Taizong deposed Li Chengqian while executing the other conspirators. He then promised Li Tai he would be created crown prince—and Li Tai, wanting to appear appreciative, told Emperor Taizong that, if he were allowed to inherit the throne, he would kill his own son and make his younger brother, Li Zhi (the Prince of Jin), crown prince. Emperor Taizong was touched, but Chu immediately pointed out the disingenuity in Li Tai's remarks, and advocated that Li Zhi be made crown prince instead—an opinion shared by Emperor Taizong's brother-in-law Zhangsun Wuji, who was a maternal uncle of both Li Tai and Li Zhi. Soon, Emperor Taizong, who had also come to the conclusion that Li Tai's machinations were responsible for Li Chengqian's downfall, after first revealing his decision only to Zhangsun, Chu, Fang Xuanling, and Li Shiji, created Li Zhi crown prince and exiled Li Tai. Chu was made a junior advisor to the new crown prince, and Emperor Taizong had him, Liu Ji, Cen Wenben, and Ma Zhou often visit Li Zhi to advise Li Zhi on his studies.

Later in 643, Emperor Taizong was poised to, as per promises he made earlier, marry his daughter Princess Xinxing to Xueyantuo's Zhenzhu Khan, Yi'nan, when he, agreeing with the general Qibi Heli (契苾何力), made excuses and broke off the marriage treaty. Chu advised against breaking the treaty, but Emperor Taizong did not listen. In 644, Chu also advised against the campaign against Goguryeo, although Emperor Taizong launched the campaign anyway after Li Shiji advocated for it. (The campaign would eventually end in failure in 645.) Later in 644, when Emperor Taizong, at an imperial gathering, stated to his key officials their strengths and weaknesses, he spoke, with regard to Chu:

Chu Suiliang is knowledgeable and firm. He often submitted faithful advice and is close to my heart, just as a delicate bird that deserves tender treatment.

He soon made Chu Huangmen Shilang (黃門侍郎), the deputy head of the examination bureau of government (門下省, Menxia Sheng), but further gave Chu the designation of Canyu Chaozheng (參預朝政), as a de facto chancellor.

In 645, Chu was involved in an incident that would result in Liu Ji's death. After the end of the Goguryeo campaign, Emperor Taizong returned to Ding Prefecture (定州, roughly modern Baoding, Hebei) and was ill at that time. After Liu and Ma visited Emperor Taizong at his secondary palace and exited it, Chu asked them what the emperor's condition was, and Liu, weeping, stated, "The emperor is extremely ill, and it makes me worried!" Chu then falsely reported to Emperor Taizong that Liu said, "There is nothing to worry about as far as the matters of state were concerned. We only need to assist the young emperor. By the precedents of Yi Yin and Huo Guang, we execute the high level officials who were double-minded, and the state will be secure." Because Liu had previously made comments to Emperor Taizong that if any officials were unfaithful, he would execute them immediately, Emperor Taizong believed the accusation. Liu asked Ma to corroborate his innocence, and Ma did so, but Chu insisted that Liu did make the inappropriate comments. Emperor Taizong, believing Chu, ordered that Liu commit suicide, but pardoned his family.

In 646, Emperor Taizong sent 22 imperial officials to visit the prefectures throughout the empire, to see how the prefectures were governed. These officials submitted many accusations of misrules against prefects and county magistrates and proposed that those prefects and magistrates be punished. Many of the accused officials submitted appeals to Emperor Taizong, and Emperor Taizong put Chu in charge of reviewing the appeals. Eventually, Emperor Taizong made the final decision to find 20 of the officials innocent and promote them, to find seven severely guilty and execute them, and to give lesser punishments to almost 1,000 others. Later that year, Fang was dismissed from his chancellor post for a minor infraction, and Chu advised Emperor Taizong that Fang had great contributions to his rule and should not be easily dismissed. Emperor Taizong agreed and summoned Fang back to serve as chancellor.

In 648, Chu was made Zhongshu Ling (中書令) — the head of the legislative bureau of government and a post considered one for a chancellor.

In summer 649, Emperor Taizong, while at Cuiwei Palace (翠微宮), was severely ill. He summoned Zhangsun and Chu into his presence and entrusted Li Zhi to them. He soon died, and Li Zhi succeeded him (as Emperor Gaozong). Zhangsun and Chu, trusted by the new emperor, became effectively in charge of the government.

== During Emperor Gaozong's reign ==
It was said that Zhangsun Wuji and Chu Suiliang worked well together and were effective in assisting Emperor Gaozong in governance, and that therefore, early in Emperor Gaozong's reign, the government was as effective as during the reign of Emperor Taizong. Emperor Gaozong enfeoffed him as the Duke of Henan.

In winter 650, Chu was charged by the imperial censor Wei Siqian of forcing a government interpreter to sell his land to Chu. Initially, the deputy chief judge of the supreme court, Zhang Ruice (張叡冊), ruled that Chu had broken no laws because he had paid compensation to the interpreter, but Wei pointed out to Emperor Gaozong that Chu had paid just the amount of compensation equal to government condemnation of the property, not fair market value, and Emperor Gaozong demoted Chu to the post of prefect of Tong Prefecture (同州, roughly modern Weinan, Shaanxi). In spring 652, Emperor Gaozong recalled Chu from Tong Prefecture to serve as the minister of civil service affairs and gave him the de facto chancellor designation of Tong Zhongshu Menxia Sanpin (同中書門下三品).

In winter 652, after a plot by Emperor Gaozong's sister, Princess Gaoyang, and her husband, Fang Yi'ai (房遺愛, Fang Xuanling's son), to support her uncle, Li Yuanjing (李元景, the Prince of Jing), as emperor was discovered, Zhangsun expanded the investigation and falsely executed a number of other people as alleged conspirators in spring 653, including Emperor Gaozong's elder brother, Li Ke (the Prince of Wu), whom Emperor Taizong had considered as possible crown prince at one point and thus viewed by Zhangsun as a threat to Emperor Gaozong. Historical accounts implied, but did not state, that Chu was also involved in these false accusations, as Li Daozong (the Prince of Jiangxia), a renowned general, was said to be implicated and exiled because he was a rival of both Zhangsun and Chu.

In fall 653, Chu was made Puye (僕射), the head of the executive bureau of government, but also continued to be in charge of civil service affairs.

By 655, Emperor Gaozong's wife, Empress Wang, had lost his favor, and Emperor Gaozong's concubine Consort Wu wanted to displace her, and therefore falsely accused her of using witchcraft and also of killing Emperor Gaozong's infant daughter by Consort Wu. (Traditional historians generally believed that Consort Wu killed her daughter herself in order to falsely implicate Empress Wang.) After one imperial gathering, Emperor Gaozong summoned the chancellors Chu, Zhangsun, Li Shiji (by now known as Li Ji due to naming taboo with Emperor Taizong's name), and Yu Zhining to the palace. Chu correctly guessed that Emperor Gaozong wanted to discuss with them deposing Empress Wang and replacing her with Consort Wu. Li Ji declined to enter the palace. When Chu, Zhangsun, and Yu met Emperor Gaozong, Emperor Gaozong tried to get their concurrence to depose Empress Wang and replace her with Consort Wu. Zhangsun and Yu were silent to implicitly show their disapproval, while Chu was adamantly against it—citing the facts that Emperor Taizong had entrusted not only Emperor Gaozong, but also Empress Wang, to him, and that Consort Wu had previously been Emperor Taizong's concubine, and therefore having her as empress would be considered incest under Confucian principles. During the meeting, he became so emotional that he hit his head repeatedly on the ground while bowing such that he bled, and he also offered to resign, drawing Emperor Gaozong's ire. (Consort Wu, who was listening from behind a screen, could not hold herself back and yelled, "Why not kill him?" Zhangsun responded, "Chu Suiliang was a high level official that the deceased emperor entrusted the emperor to. Even if he committed a crime, he should not be physically harmed.") Two other chancellors, Han Yuan and Lai Ji, also opposed Consort Wu's ascension, to no avail, and eventually, when Li Ji made the comment that this was simply the emperor's own family matter, Emperor Gaozong became resolved to carry out the change. He demoted Chu out of the capital, to serve as the commandant at Tan Prefecture (roughly modern Changsha, Hunan), and a month later, in winter 655, he deposed Empress Wang and her ally Consort Xiao, whom Consort Wu had also accused of witchcraft, and created Consort Wu empress to replace Empress Wang. In 656, Han tried to intercede on Chu's behalf to have him recalled to the capital, but Emperor Gaozong, while acknowledging Chu's faithfulness, stated that he was being uncontrollable, and refused Han's request. Meanwhile, Liu Ji's son, Liu Hongye (劉弘業), in a move engineered by the chancellor Li Yifu, who despised Chu, submitted a petition asking that his father be posthumously cleared of wrongdoing, accusing Chu of falsely accusing his father. Many officials, wanting to ingratiate themselves with Li Yifu, all agreed with the petition, but Le Yanwei pointed out that clearing Liu would effectively state that Emperor Taizong's punishment was inappropriate. Emperor Gaozong agreed and took no action on Liu Hongye's petition.

Soon thereafter, Empress Wu became exceedingly powerful, and several of her allies were made chancellors. In 657, Chu, while remaining a commandant, had his command moved from Tan Prefecture to the more distant Gui Prefecture (桂州, roughly modern Guilin, Guangxi). Empress Wu's allies Li Yifu and Xu Jingzong then falsely accused Han and Lai of conspiring in treason with Chu—stating that Gui Prefecture was a key military location and that Han and Lai had moved Chu there in preparation for a revolt. Emperor Gaozong demoted Han and Lai to distant prefectural posts, while further demoting Chu to the post of prefect of Ai Prefecture—at the extreme southern border of the empire. Chu, after arriving at Ai Prefecture, submitted a petition pleading his own case, pointing how he had supported Emperor Gaozong as crown prince and later assisted him in governance, but his pleas fell on deaf ears. He died in 658, while still serving as the prefect of Ai Prefecture. In 659, when Zhangsun was falsely accused of treason and exiled (and later forced to commit suicide), Xu and Li Yifu falsely accused Chu of having encouraged Zhangsun to plot. In response, Emperor Gaozong posthumously stripped Chu of all of his posts and exiled his descendants to Ai Prefecture as well; Chu's sons Chu Yanfu (楮彥甫) and Chu Yanchong (楮彥沖) were killed on their way to exile. When Emperor Gaozong died in 683, by his will, Chu's family was allowed to return to his home prefecture. In 705, after Empress Wu's own death (after she had taken over as sovereign for a number of years but had recently been overthrown and replaced by her son Emperor Zhongzong), by her will (although whether she wrote the will was questionable), Chu's titles were restored.

== Calligraphy ==
When Chu was put in charge of recording Emperor Taizong's acts for historical records in 636, it might have been at least partly due to his skills at calligraphy, as it was recorded that Emperor Taizong had, on one occasion, commented to the chancellor Wei Zheng that after Yu Shinan's death, there was no one that he could discuss calligraphy with—and when Wei heard this, he recommended Chu's calligraphy, and Emperor Taizong immediately summoned Chu into his presence. When, on one occasion, Emperor Taizong put out notices of rewards, requesting that people submit works of the great Jin dynasty calligrapher Wang Xizhi to him, many people submitted purported works by Wang, and it became difficult to tell which were genuine and which were forged. Chu was put in charge of discerning these purported Wang works, and he was able to clearly distinguish them.

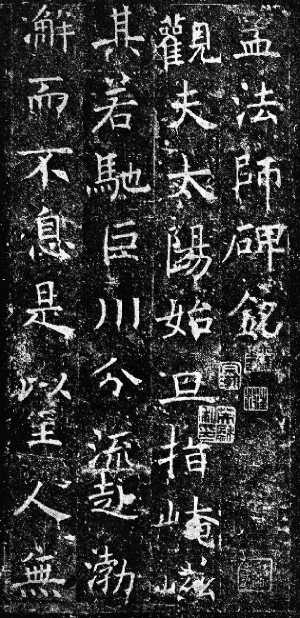
Meng Fashi Stele (褚遂良 孟法師碑銘)

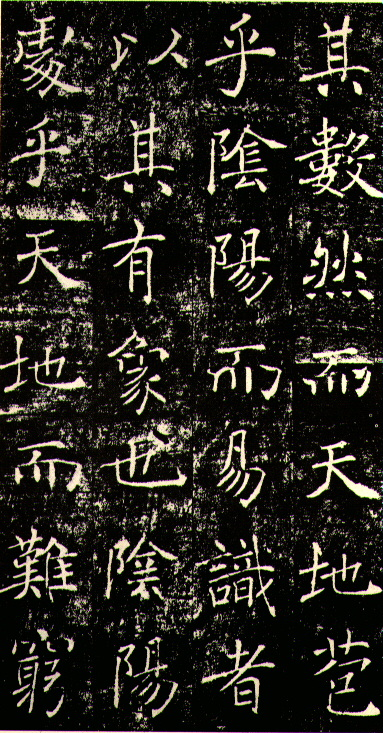
The Emperor’s Preface to the Sacred Teachings (褚遂良 雁塔聖教序)
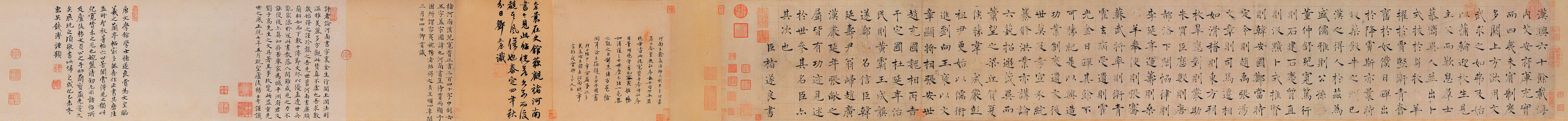
Ni Kuan Zan (Comments on the Biography of Ni Kuan) by Chu Suiliang

== Notes and references ==
- Old Book of Tang, vol. 80.
- New Book of Tang, vol. 105.
- Zizhi Tongjian, vols. 195, 196, 197, 198, 199, 200.
