= Pure Consort Xiao =

Tang dynasty imperial consort of Emperor Gaozong

Consort Xiao
- Died: 3 December 655; Chang'an, Tang dynasty
- Spouse: Emperor Gaozong of Tang
- Issue: Li Sujie, Prince of Xu; Princess Yiyang; Princess Gao'an

Consort Xiao, Pure Consort Xiao or Xiao Shufei (蕭淑妃, personal name unknown) (died c.November 655), was a concubine of Emperor Gaozong of Tang (Li Zhi). She was initially favored by him and bore him a son and two daughters—Li Sujie and the Princesses Yiyang and Gao'an—but later, after her romantic rival Empress Wang introduced another concubine, Consort Wu (later known as Wu Zetian), to Emperor Gaozong, Emperor Gaozong became enamored with Consort Wu. Empress Wang and Consort Xiao instead joined forces to try to counter Consort Wu, but in 655, Emperor Gaozong deposed both of them on accusations of witchcraft and replaced Empress Wang with Consort Wu. Soon, according to later sources they were cruelly executed on the new Empress Wu's orders.

== Background ==
Little is known about Consort Xiao's background. What is known is that she was already a concubine of Li Zhi when he was crown prince under his father Emperor Taizong, as her son Li Sujie was born in 646, before his ascension in 649. While she was a concubine to the crown prince, she carried the title of Liangdi (良娣). In addition to Li Sujie, she bore two daughters, who were probably older than Li Sujie. It was also said that she was favored by Li Zhi, more so than his wife Crown Princess Wang.

== As imperial consort ==
In 649, after Emperor Taizong died, Li Zhi took the throne (as Emperor Gaozong). He bestowed upon Crown Princess Wang the Empress title, and appointed Consort Xiao the rank of Shufei, the second highest rank for all imperial concubines. She continued to be favored, drawing the ire of Empress Wang, eventually leading to an intense rivalry.

When Emperor Gaozong was crown prince, he had been attracted by the beauty of one of Emperor Taizong's concubines, Consort Wu. After Emperor Taizong's death, all of his concubines who did not bear sons were housed at Ganye Temple (感業寺) to be Buddhist nuns. In either 650 or 651, when Emperor Gaozong was visiting Ganye Temple to offer incense to Buddha, he saw Consort Wu. Both of them wept. When Empress Wang heard this, she, wanting to divert Emperor Gaozong's favor from Consort Xiao, secretly instructed Consort Wu to grow her hair back, while suggesting to Emperor Gaozong that he take her as a concubine. Consort Wu was intelligent and calculating, and after returning to the palace, acted humbly in the presence of Empress Wang. Eventually, she gained the favor of the empress, and was instructed to directly serve Emperor Gaozong. Soon, Emperor Gaozong became enamored with Consort Wu, and both Empress Wang and Consort Xiao lost favor. The two realized the seriousness of the situation, and joined forces to try to alienate Consort Wu from Emperor Gaozong, but were unsuccessful.

In 654, Consort Wu framed Empress Wang for the death of her daughter, and in 655 further accused Empress Wang and her mother Lady Liu of using witchcraft. Emperor Gaozong deposed both Empress Wang and Consort Xiao, reducing them to commoner rank and imprisoning them inside the palace.

== Death and aftermath ==
The New Book of Tang, meaning the later-edited history of Tang dynasty, was compiled in the North Song dynasty, which is around 400 years after the recorded time of Consort Xiao's death. The Old Book of Tang, meaning the formerly-compiled history of Tang dynasty, was completed around 945 A.D. and contains less inaccurate information than its predecessor. Both of these compilations are several hundred years away from Consort Xiao's and Wu Zetian's active period and contain the shocking and strange story in the following paragraph. Notwithstanding, the Old Book of Tang also clearly states that Consort Xiao and Empress Wang were strangled to death, other than different tortures human beings could bear under ancient medical conditions. A much earlier history, Tang Huiyao (唐會要) (begun 8th century) records no such events. Therefore, historians in generations after the Song dynasty conclude that the strange story was adapted by editors of the early Song dynasty from the horrible deeds of Han dynasty's Empress Dowager Lü Zhi, in order to defame and demonize Wu, the only female emperor ever, and to restrain later empress dowagers' power. Empress Liu (劉娥 Liu E), the most powerful empress dowager in the Song dynasty, had similar life experience to Wu and wore imperial robes (emperor's outfit). The editors of the New Book of Tang coexisted with Liu E for a certain period. Apart from this, there are several discrepancies and inconsistencies in the New Book of Tang and the Old Book of Tang. In recent years, more inconsistencies and contradictions have appeared when unearthed epitaphs are compared with relevant history compilations. For instance and reference, some of the key content on the Epitaph of Shangguan Wan'er (上官婉兒墓志) go against relevant recordings. Viewer discretion and critical thinking are advised while reading those texts. In conclusion, Consort Xiao and Empress Wang were most likely strangled to death.

Six days after Empress Wang's removal, Consort Wu was created empress. By order of the new Empress Wu, Empress Wang and Consort Xiao were put under arrest inside the palace, at a building that had its doors and windows tightly sealed, with only a hole on the wall to deliver food. One day, after the coronation of Empress Wu, Emperor Gaozong thought of them and decided to visit them; when he saw the conditions they were in, he was saddened, calling out, "Empress, Shufei, where are you?" Empress Wang wept and responded, "We have been found guilty and reduced to be maidservants. How can we still be referred to by honored titles?" She also begged, "If Your Imperial Majesty considered our past relationships and will allow us to again see the light of day, please rename this place 'Huixin Courtyard' [(回心院, meaning "the courtyard of Repentance")]." Emperor Gaozong was initially receptive, responding, "I will do so right away." However, when Empress Wu heard this, she was enraged and issued their death warrants and sent people to cane Empress Wang and Consort Xiao 100 times each and cut off their hands and feet. She then had them put into large wine jars, saying, "Let these two witches be drunk to their bones!" When Empress Wang was informed of the orders, she bowed and stated, "May His Imperial Majesty live forever, and may Zhaoyi [(昭儀, Empress Wu's title as a concubine, implicitly refusing to acknowledge her as empress)] be favored forever. Dying is within my responsibility." However, Consort Xiao cursed Empress Wu by saying, "Wu is a treacherous monster! I will be reincarnated as a cat and she would be reincarnated as a mouse so that I could grab her throat forever and ever!" Empress Wang and Consort Xiao suffered for several days inside the wine jars before dying, and Empress Wu had their bodies taken out of the wine jars and beheaded. When Empress Wu heard of Consort Xiao's curse, she forbade the palace personnel from keeping cats as pets, and even ordered the banning of cats as pets in the capital, Chang'an, but thereafter often dreamed of Empress Wang and Consort Xiao, with scattered hair and bleeding limbs, seeking to kill her. She thereafter initially moved to Penglai Palace (蓬萊宮), but continued to dream of them, and therefore eventually spent most time in the eastern capital Luoyang and not in the capital Chang'an, where these events occurred. Soon after Empress Wang's and Consort Xiao's deaths, at Empress Wu's urging, Emperor Gaozong had Empress Wang and her clan's surname changed from Wang (王, a typical surname meaning "king" or "monarch") to Mang (蟒, meaning "python") and Consort Xiao's and her clan's surname changed from Xiao (萧, another typical surname meaning "sad" or "calm") to Xiao (梟, meaning "owl"). Only after Empress Wu's own death in 705 were their clans' proper surnames restored.

On the orders of Empress Wu, both of Consort Xiao's daughters, who by now carried the titles of Princess Yiyang and Princess Gao'an, were put under house arrest inside the palace, and were not allowed to marry. Not until Empress Wu's oldest son, the crown prince Li Hong interceded, probably in 671, were they allowed to marry—and even then, Empress Wu simply found two imperial guards, Quan Yi (權毅) (for Princess Yiyang) and Wang Xu (王勗) (for Princess Gao'an) to marry them immediately. Meanwhile, Li Sujie was allowed to be an imperial prince but continuously drew Empress Wu's hatred, causing him to be demoted and put under close watch a number of times. This situation was exacerbated by the unstoppable rise of Empress Wu's influence and power over the throne, especially as Emperor Gaozong's illness grew, and he in 690, was eventually killed on the orders of Empress Wu (who by then was empress dowager and regent) during the Tianshou era of her reign.

== Modern depictions ==
- Portrayed by Chan Choi Yin in the 1984 Hong-Kong TV series Empress Wu.
- Portrayed by Kung Lien Hua in the 1985 Taiwanese TV series The Empress of the Dynasty.
- Portrayed by Yu Hui in the 1995 Chinese TV series Wu Zetian.
- Portrayed by Jessie Chang in the 2003 Chinese TV series Lady Wu: The First Empress.
- Portrayed by Xie Jin Tian in the 2006 Chinese TV series Wu Zi Bei Ge.
- Portrayed by Ban Min-jung in 2006-2007 SBS TV series Yeon Gaesomun.
- Portrayed by Li Na in the 2011 TV series Secret History of Empress Wu.
- Portrayed by Sui Jun Bo in the 2011 Chinese TV series Meng Hui Tang Chao.
- Portrayed by Cao Xiwen in the 2011 Chinese TV series Beauty World.
- Portrayed by Zhang Xinyu in the 2014 Chinese TV series The Empress of China.
- Portrayed by Li Wen Wen (though her character is renamed "Consort Xu") in the 2014 Chinese TV series Young Sherlock.
- Portrayed by Liu Hai Lan in the 2017 Chinese TV series Legendary Di Renjie.

== Notes and references ==
- Old Book of Tang, vol. 51 .
- New Book of Tang, vol. 76 .
- Zizhi Tongjian, vols. 199, 200.
