= List of people with surname Li =

This is a list of people with the surname Li (李). Lǐ is the pinyin romanization of the Chinese surname written 李 in Chinese character. It is one of the most common surnames in China and the world, shared by more than 93 million people in China, and more than 100 million worldwide. It is often spelled as Lee in Hong Kong, Macau, Taiwan and many overseas Chinese communities. In Macau, it is also spelled as Lei. It is commonly spelled in Indonesia as Lie, and in Vietnam it is also spelled as Lý.

== Business ==
- Lee Choon Seng (李俊承; 1888–1966), businessman, philanthropist, and former chairman of OCBC Bank
- Lee Kong Chian (李光前; 1893–1967), businessman, philanthropist, founder of the Lee Foundation, and co-founder and chairman of the OCBC Bank
- Li Ka-shing (李嘉誠; born 1928), Hong Kong billionaire businessman and philanthropist
- Lee Shau-kee (李兆基; 1928–2025), Hong Kong billionaire businessman, philanthropist, and founder of Henderson Land Development; father of Martin Lee
- Lie Mo Tie (李文正; born 1929), Indonesian financial magnate and founder of Lippo Group; father of Li Bai
- Lee Hsien Yang (李显扬; born 1957), former CEO of Singtel and former chairman of Fraser and Neave; son of Lee Kuan Yew and brother of Lee Hsien Loong and Lee Wei Ling
- Li Bai (李白; born 1957), Chinese Indonesian businessman and chairman of Lippo Group; son of Lie Mo Tie
- Kai-Fu Lee (李開復; born 1961), computer scientist, businessman, former president of Google China
- Li Ning (李宁; born 1963), Chinese retired gymnast, biollionare entrepreneur, and founder of Li-Ning Company Limited
- Peter Lee (born 1963), lawyer and co-chairman of Henderson Land Development and Hong Kong and China Gas; son of Lee Shau-kee and brother of Martin Lee
- Victor Li (李澤鉅; born 1964), businessman, chairman of CK Asset Holdings, CK Hutchison Holdings, CK Life Sciences, and CK Infrastructure Holdings, and director of HSBC; son of Li Ka-shing and brother of Richard Li
- Richard Li (李澤楷, born 1966), businessman, philanthropist, chairman of Hong Kong Telecom, and founder and chairman of Pacific Century Group; son of Li Ka-shing and brother of Victor Li
- Li Lu (李录; born 1966), businessman and former student protestor
- Martin Lee (李家誠; born 1971), co-chairman of Henderson Land Development and Hong Kong and China Gas; son of Lee Shau-kee and brother of Peter Lee
- Aiiso Yufeng Li (李雨峰), Founder and Chief Strategy Officer of CorDx; advisor of UC San Diego Jacobs School of Engineering; Serves on the board of trustees at UC San Diego

== Criminals ==
- Li Shikang (born 1955), Chinese serial killer
- Li Pingping (李平苹; 1960–2004), executed Chinese serial killer
- Vincent Li (李伟光; born 1968), Chinese-Canadian man who brutally murdered fellow Greyhound bus passenger Tim McLean
- Li Guangjun (born 1969), Chinese serial killer and rapist on death row
- Li Hao (李浩; 1977–2014), executed Chinese murderer and rapist
- Li Yijiang (李义江; 1980–2004), executed Chinese serial killer
- Li Ang (李昂; born c. 1985), student arrested for the murder of his girlfriend Amanda Zhao in 2002
- Li Xiangnan (李向南; born c. 1991), student arrested for the murder of his girlfriend Shao Tong in 2014

== Fictional characters ==
- Miss Lee in Missee Lee (1941)
- Lee in East of Eden (1952)
- Li Ren in Hanasakeru Seishōnen (1987–1994, 2009–2010)
- Li Mei in Mortal Kombat (1991–present)
- Lee Diendou in Fighter's History (1993–1997)
- Wanda Li in The Magic School Bus (1994–2001, 2017–2021)
- Lee Chaolan in Tekken (1994–present)
- Syaoran Li and his four sisters, Meiling Li, and Yelan Li in Cardcaptor Sakura (1996–2000)
- Li Kohran in Sakura Wars (1996–2019)
- Li Shang in Mulan (1998)
- Lee Bailong in Shaman King (2001–2002)
- Li Xiangying in Angel Heart (2001–2010)
- Professor Li in Okashina Okashi – Strange Candy (2001–2018)
- Lenalee and Komui Lee in D.Gray-man (2004–present)
- Li Xiaoyao in Chinese Paladin (2005)
- Li Kouyuu in The Story of Saiunkoku (2005–2012)
- Juniper Lee and her family in The Life and Times of Juniper Lee (2005–2007)
- Ranka Lee and Ozma Lee in Macross Frontier (2008)
- Li Shan in Kung Fu Panda 3 (2016)
- Meilin Lee in Turning Red (2022)

== Film and television ==
- Li Han-hsiang (李翰祥; 1926–1996), Chinese film director
- Lie Tek Swie (李德水; fl 1929–1940), Indonesian film director active in the Dutch East Indies
- Bruce Lee (李小龍; 1940–1973), Hong Kong American actor and martial artist; son of Lee Hoi-chuen, brother of Robert Lee and Peter Lee, and father of Brandon Lee and Shannon Lee
- China Lee (born 1942), Chinese American actress, model, and former Playboy Playmate
- Danny Lee Sau-Yin (李修賢; born 1952), Hong Kong actor, filmmaker, and presenter
- Ang Lee (李安; born 1954), Taiwanese filmmaker
- Li Yang (李杨; born 1959), Chinese film writer and director
- Daniel Lee Yan-Kong (李仁港; born 1960), Hong Kong film director, screen
- Jet Li (李连杰; born 1963), Chinese-born Singaporean martial artist and actor
- Li Nanxing (李南星; born 1964), Singaporean actor, businessman, and filmmaker
- Brandon Lee (李國豪; 1965–1993), Chinese American actor and martial artist; son of Bruce Lee and brother of Shannon Lee
- Mark Lee Kok Huang (李國煌; born 1968), Singaporean comedian, actor, host and businessman
- Li Yong (李詠; 1968–2018), Chinese television host
- Shannon Lee (李香凝; born 1969), Chinese American actress and businesswoman; daughter of Bruce Lee and sister of Brandon Lee
- Sandra Lee (born 1970), American dermatologist and YouTube personality known for her show Dr. Pimple Popper
- Christopher Lee Meng Soon (李銘順; born 1971), Malaysian-Singaporean actor, host, and businessman
- Pui Fan Lee (born 1971), English actress and television presenter
- Ivy Lee (born 1973), Singaporean former actress and television host
- Li Yu (李玉; born 1973), Chinese film director
- Li Bingbing (李冰冰; born 1973), Chinese actress and singer
- Johnson Lee (李思捷; born 1974), Hong Kong-Canadian TVB actor
- Sam Lee (李灿森; born 1975), Hong Kong actor
- Angelica Lee (李心潔; born 1976), Malaysian Chinese film actress and pop singer
- Lee San-san (李珊珊; born 1977), 1996 Miss Hong Kong Pageant winner
- Selena Lee (李施嬅; born 1981), Hong Kong-born Chinese Canadian actress
- Sophia Li, Chinese American journalist and film director
- Ali Lee (李佳芯; born 1982), Hong Konger actress and television host contracted to TVB
- Rain Lee (李彩華; born 1982), Hong Kong actress and singer
- Lee Teng (李腾; born 1982), Singaporean actor
- Tsuyoshi Abe (李振冬; born Li Zhendong, 1982), Chinese-Japanese actor
- Charmaine Li (born 1983), Hongkonger actress, model, businesswoman, and spokesperson
- Zack Lee (born 1984), Indonesian British actor, model, and boxer
- Leanne Li (李亞男; born 1984), Chinese-Canadian actress, 2004 Miss Chinese Vancouver, and 2005 Miss Chinese International
- Levy Li (李素琳; born 1987), Miss Malaysia Universe 2008
- Aarif Lee (李治廷; born 1987), Hongkonger actor and singer
- Li Yitong (李一桐; born 1993), Chinese actress and singer
- Jessie Mei Li (born 1995), British actress
- Li Zehua (李泽华; born 1995), Chinese citizen journalist, rapper, and YouTuber
- Li Hongyi (李宏毅; born 1998), Chinese actor and singer
- Li Landi (李兰迪; born 1999), Chinese actress and model.
- Kristen Li (born 2002), American child actress, known for voicing Bubbles in the Powerpuff Girls reboot

== Literature ==
- Li Bai (李白; 701–762), poet during the Tang dynasty
- Li Shizhi (李适之; died 747), poet and politician during the Tang dynasty; son of Li Chengqian
- Li Shangyin (李商隱; c. 813–858), poet and politician during the late Tang dynasty
- Li Qingzhao (李清照; 1084-c. 1155), writer and poet during the Song dynasty
- Li Yu (李漁; 1611–1680), author and dramatist
- Lie Kim Hok (李金福; 1853–1912), teacher, writer, and social worker in the Dutch East Indies
- Stan Lee (1922–2018), birth name Stanley Martin Lieber, American comic book writer
- Li Kuei-hsien (李魁賢; 1937–2025), Taiwanese author, poet, cultural critic, translator, and inventor
- Li Ang (李昂; born 1952), pen name of Shih Shu-tuan, Taiwanese feminist writer
- Grace Ly (born 1979), French writer and podcaster
- Jing-Jing Lee (李晶晶; born 1985), author best known for her 2019 book How We Disappeared

== Military ==
- Li Xin (李信; c. 200s BCE), Qin general during the Warring States period
- Li Guang (李廣; 184–119 BCE), Han dynasty general and part of the Longxi Commandery; descendent of Li Xin and great-great-grandfather of Li Ling
- Li Guangli (李廣利; died c. 88 BCE), Han dynasty general; brother of Li Yannian
- Li Ling (李陵; died c. 74 BCE), Han dynasty general who defected to Xiongnu in 99 BCE; descendent of Li Xin and Li Guang
- Li Dian (李典; c. 180–217 AD), Eastern Han dynasty military general under warlord Cao Cao
- Li Mu (李牧; died 229 BCE), Zhao military general during the Warring States period
- Li Hui (李恢; died 231 AD), Three Kingdoms military general and Shu Han state official under warlord Liu Bei
- Li Yan (李嚴; died c. 234 AD), Three Kingdoms military general in Shu Han
- Li Liu (李流; 248–303 AD), military general and one of the spiritual founders of the Cheng-Han dynasty during the Sixteen Kingdoms period; brother of Li Liu and uncle of Li Xiong
- Li Te (李特; died 303 AD), military general and one of the spiritual founders of the Cheng-Han dynasty during the Sixteen Kingdoms period; brother of Li Liu and father of Li Xiong
- Li Jing (李靖; 571–649), Tang dynasty military general and writer
- Li Mi (李密; 582–619), Sui dynasty military general, monarch, poet, and politician
- Li Shiji (李世勣; c. 594–669 AD), Tang dynasty military general
- Li Jinzhong (李盡忠; died 696), khan of the Khitan Kingdom
- Li Kaigu (李楷固), general under Emperor Wu Zetian; adopted son of Li Jinzhong and grandfather of Li Guangbi
- Li Guangbi (李光弼; 708–764), Tang dynasty military general, monarch, and politician; grandson of Li Kaigu
- Li Mi (李密; 722–789), military general and strategist during the Tang dynasty
- Li Zhengji (李正己; 733–781), military general during the Tang dynasty; father of Li Na
- Li Na (李納; 758–792), military general and politician during the Tang dynasty; son of Li Zhengji and father of Li Shigu and Li Shidao
- Li Shigu (李師古; 778–806), military general and politician during the Tang dynasty; son of Li Na and brother of Li Shidao
- Li Shidao (李師道; died 819), military general and politician during the Tang dynasty; son of Li Na and brother of Li Shigu
- Li Keyong (李克用; 856–908), Shatuo military general and politician and Prince of Jin; son of Li Guochang and father of Li Cunxu and Li Siyuan
- Li Siyuan (李嗣源; 867–933), military general of the Jin dynasty and second emperor of the Later Tang dynasty; adopted son of Li Keyong, adoptive brother of Li Cunxu, and father of Li Chonghou, Li Congke, and Li Conghou
- Li Cunxu (後唐莊宗); 885–926), ruling prince of the Former Jin dynasty and founding emperor of the Later Tang dynasty during the Five Dynasties and Ten Kingdoms period; son of Li Keyong and adoptive brother of Li Siyuan
- Li Guochang (李國昌; died 887), Shatuo general during the Tang dynasty
- Li Rusong (李如松; 1549–1598), Ming dynasty military commander; son of Li Chengliang
- Li Chengliang (李成梁; 1526–1615), Ming dynasty military general; father of Li Rusong
- Li Yingshi (李應試; fl c. 1600), Chinese military officer, scientist, and astrologer during the Ming dynasty
- Li Hongzhang (李鴻章; 1823–1901), military general and diplomat during the Qing dynasty; uncle of Li Jingxi
- John Lie (李約翰; 1911–1988), naval commander and National Hero of Indonesia
- Li Guidan (cmn) (李桂丹; 1913–1938), Republic of China Air Force commanding officer of the Zhihang Fighter Group during the War of Resistance-World War II
- Li Han (李汉; 1924–1997), Chinese flying ace of the Korean War
- Li Han (李汉; 1924–1997), Chinese flying ace of the Korean War
- Li Qi (李启; 1960–1979), Chinese soldier

== Music ==
- Li Yannian (李延年; died 90 BCE), musician during the Han dynasty
- Lee Hoi-chuen (李海泉; 1901–1965), Cantonese opera singer and actor; father of Bruce Lee, Robert Lee, and Peter Lee
- Robert Lee (李振輝; born 1948), Hongkonger musician; son of Lee Hoi-chuen and brother of Bruce Lee and Peter Lee
- Dick Lee (李炳文; born 1956), Singaporean musician, playwright, and film director
- Hacken Lee (李克勤; born 1967), Hong Kong-based Cantopop singer, television host, and actor
- Sam Lee Sheng Jie (李聖傑; born 1973), Hong Kong singer
- Coco Lee (李玟; 1975–2023), Hongkonger singer and actress
- Herman Li (李康敏; born 1976), guitarist from DragonForce
- Li Yundi (李云迪; born 1982), Chinese pianist
- Jess Lee, as in the following singers:
  - Jess Lee (Canadian singer)
  - Jess Lee (Malaysian singer) (李佳薇; born 1988)
- Annette Lee (李安; born 1992), Singaporean singer and YouTube personality
- Li Wenhan (李汶翰; born 1994), Chinese singer and actor, member of UNIQ and UNINE
- Li Yitong (singer) (李艺彤, born 1995), Chinese idol singer, actress, and member of SNH48
- Li Zhenning (李振宁; born 1995), Chinese singer and actor, member of UNINE

== Mythology ==
- Li Er (李耳), ancient Chinese Taoist philosopher credited with writing Tao Te Ching
- Li Jing (李靖), Shang dynasty general in Chinese mythology

== Politics and government ==
- Li Si (李斯; c. 208–280 BCE), Chancellor during the Qin dynasty, as well as a calligrapher and philosopher
- Li Bing (李昞; died 572 AD), politician during the Northern Zhou dynasty; father of Li Yuan
- Li Jifu (李吉甫; 758–814 AD), cartographer, historian, and politician during the Tang dynasty; father of Li Deyu
- Li Deyu (李德裕; 787–850 AD), poet, politician, and writer during the Tang dynasty; son of Li Jifu
- Li Guangdi (李光地; Pe̍h-ōe-jī: Lí Kong-tē; 1642–1718), also known by his courtesy name Jinqing (Chinese: 晉卿; Pe̍h-ōe-jī: Chìn-kheng) and sobriquet Hou'an (Chinese: 厚庵; Pe̍h-ōe-jī: Hō͘-am), was a Chinese neo-Confucianist court official during the reign of the Kangxi Emperor of the Qing dynasty.
- Li Jingxi (李經羲; 1857–1925), former Premier of the Republic of China; nephew of Li Hongzhang
- Li Dazhao (李大釗; 1889–1927), co-founder of the Chinese Communist Party
- Li Zongren (李宗仁; 1890–1969), Vice President of the Republic of China and briefly its acting President
- Li Xiannian (李先念; 1909–1992), former President of China and Communist leader
- Li Tianmin (李天民; 1909–1993), Chinese Nationalist politician and political historian
- Lee Siew Choh (李绍祖; 1917–2002), Singaporean doctor and politician
- Lee Teng-hui (李登輝; 1923–2020), former President of Taiwan
- Lee Kuan Yew (李光耀; 1923–2015), first Prime Minister of Singapore; father of Lee Wei Ling, Lee Hsien Loong, and Lee Hsien Yang
- Li Peng (李鹏; 1928–2019), former Premier of China
- Li Ruihuan (李瑞环; born 1934), retired Chinese politician and former Chinese Communist Party leader
- Li Lanqing (李岚清; born 1932), Former Vice Premier of China
- Li Ao (李敖; 1935–2018), Taiwanese writer and former member of the Legislative Yuan
- Lee San Choon (李三春; 1935–2023), Malaysian politician, businessman and fourth president of Malaysian Chinese Association
- Li Guixian (李贵鲜; born 1937), retired Chinese politician and former governor of the People's Bank of China
- Lee Chiaw Meng (李昭铭; 1937–2001), retired Singaporoean politician and civil servant
- Martin Lee (李柱銘; born 1938), founder of the United Democrats of Hong Kong and Hong Kong's Democratic Party
- Sir David Li (李國寶; born 1939), politician, executive chairman of Bank of East Asia and pro-chancellor of the University of Hong Kong
- Lee Myung-bak (이명박; born 1941), former President of South Korea
- Li Changchun (李长春; born 1944), retired politician and former Chinese Communist Party leader
- Lee Yock Suan (李玉全; born 1946), former Singaporean politician
  - Desmond Lee Ti-Seng (李智陞; born 1976), Singaporean politician and son of Yock Suan
- Lee Han-shen (李漢申; born 1947), former President of Taiwan Power Company
- Andrew Li (李國能; born 1948), Hong Kong's first Chief Justice of the Court of Final Appeal
- Lee Sush-der (李述德; born 1951), former Minister of Finance of Taiwan
- Lee Hsien Loong (李显龙; born 1952), Prime Minister of Singapore since 2004; son of Lee Kuan Yew and brother of Lee Wei Ling and Lee Hsien Yang
- Ed Lee (李孟賢; 1952–2017), American politician and lawyer
- Lee Shying-jow (李翔宙; born 1952), Ambassador to Denmark of the Republic of China since 2019
- Lee Ying-yuan (李應元; 1953–2021), former Minister of Environmental Protection Administration in Taiwan
- Lee Yung-te (李永得; born 1955), Chairman of the Central News Agency of Taiwan since 2023
- Li Keqiang (李克强; 1955–2023), economist and former Premier of China
- Li Qiang (李强; born 1959), Premier of China
- Li Xi (李希; born 1956), Secretary of the Central Commission for Discipline Inspection
- Li Yuanchao (李源潮; born 1950), former Vice President of China
- Lee Chen-jan (李澄然; born c. 1956), Vice Minister of Foreign Affairs in Taiwan
- Lee Shu-chuan (李四川; born 1958), Deputy Mayor of Taipei since 2022
- Lee Wo-shih (李沃士; born 1960), former Magistrate of Kinmen County
- Lee Jae Myung (이재명; born 1963), current President of South Korea
- Lee Li-chen (李麗珍; born c. 1968), Deputy Minister of the Mainland Affairs Council of the Republic of China
- Lee Ying-ping (李應平; born 1969), former Political Deputy Minister of Culture of Taiwan

== Religion ==
- Witness Lee (李常受, 1905–1997), Chinese Christian minister and co-founder of Living Stream Ministry
- Li Hongzhi (李洪志; born 1951 or 1952), founder of Falun Gong

== Royalty ==
- Li Yuan (李淵; 566–635 AD), the Emperor Gaozu of Tang, founder of the Tang dynasty; son of Li Bing and father of Li Jiancheng, Li Shimin, Li Xuanba, and Li Yuanji
- Li Jiancheng (李建成; 589–626 AD), first crown prince of the Tang dynasty; son of Li Yuan and brother of Li Shimin, Li Xuanba, and Li Yuanji
- Li Shimin (唐太宗; 598–649 AD), emperor of the Tang dynasty; son of Li Yuan and brother of Li Jiancheng, Li Xuanba, and Li Yuanji; father of Li Ke, Li Tai, Li Chengqian, and Li Zhi
- Li Xuanba (李元霸; 599–614 AD), son of Li Yuan and brother of Li Jiancheng, Li Shimin, and Li Yuanji
- Li Yuanji (李元吉; 603–626 AD), son of Li Yuan and brother of Li Jiancheng, Li Shimin, and Li Xuanba
- Li Chengqian (李承乾; 618–645 AD), crown prince of the Tang dynasty; son of Li Shimin, brother of Li Tai, Li Ke, and Li Zhi, and father of Li Shizhi
- Li Ke (李恪; 619–653 AD), imperial prince of the Tang dynasty; son of Li Shimin and brother of Li Tai, Li Chengqian, and Li Zhi
- Li Tai (李泰; 620–653), imperial prince of the Tang dynasty; son of Li Shimin and brother of Li Chengqian, Li Ke, and Li Zhi
- Li Zhi (唐高宗; 628–683 AD), third emperor of the Tang dynasty; son of Li Shimin and brother of Li Tai, Li Chengqian, and Li Ke
- Li Zhong (李忠; 643–665 AD), crown prince of the Tang dynasty; son of Li Zhi and brother of Li Hong, Li Xian, Li Xian, Li Dan, and Li Sujie
- Li Sujie (李素節; 646–690 or 692), imperial prince of the Tang dynasty; son of Li Zhi and brother of Li Hong, Li Xian, Li Xian, Li Dan, and Li Zhong
- Li Hong (李弘; 652–675 AD), crown prince of the Tang dynasty; son of Li Zhi and brother of Li Xian, Li Xian, Li Dan, Li Sujie, and Li Zhong
- Li Xian (李賢; 655–684), crown prince of the Tang dynasty; son of Li Zhi and brother of Li Hong, Li Xian, Li Dan, Li Sujie, and Li Zhong
- Li Xian (唐中宗; 656–710 AD), fourth and seventh emperor of the Tang dynasty; son of Li Zhi and brother of Li Hong, Li Xian, Li Dan, Li Sujie, and Li Zhong
- Li Dan (唐睿宗; 662–716 AD), fifth and ninth emperor of the Tang dynasty; son of Li Zhi and brother of Li Hong, Li Xian, Li Xian, Li Sujie, and Li Zhong
- Li Congke (李从珂; 885–937), final emperor of the Later Tang dynasty; adopted son of Li Siyuan and adoptive brother of Li Congrong and Li Conghou
- Li Conghou (李從厚; 914–934), emperor of the Later Tang dynasty; son of Li Siyuan and brother of Li Congrong and Li Congke
- Li Congrong (李從榮; died 933), second emperor of the Later Tang dynasty; son of Li Siyuan and brother of Li Chonghou and Li Congke
- Li Yu (李煜; 937–978), third ruler of the Southern Tang state during the Five Dynasties and Ten Kingdoms period
- Li Zicheng (李自成; 1606–1645), peasant rebel leader who overthrew the Ming dynasty and the emperor of the Shun dynasty

== Scholars, academics, and scientists ==
- Li Shizhen (李時珍; 1518–1593), physician and pharmacologist during the Ming dynasty
- Yuk-Wing Lee (李郁榮; 1904–1989), electrical engineer and professor
- Choh Hao Li (李卓皓; 1913–1987), Chinese-born American biochemist and professor
- Li Pei (李佩; 1917–2017), Chinese linguist and professor of English
- Tsung-Dao Lee (李政道; 1926–2024), Chinese-American physicist, 1957 Nobel Prize in Physics winner, and professor emeritus
- Li Choh-ming (李卓敏; 1912–1991), Chinese-born American economist, educator, and vice-chancellor of the Chinese University of Hong Kong
- Li Zehou (李泽厚; 1930–2021), Chinese scholar of philosophy and intellectual history
- Yuan T. Lee (李遠哲; born 1936), Taiwanese-American chemist, 1986 Nobel Prize in Chemistry winner, and professor emeritus
- Henry Chang-Yu Lee (李昌鈺; born 1938), Taiwanese-American forensic scientist
- Wen Ho Lee (李文和; born 1939), Taiwanese-American nuclear scientist and mechanical engineer
- Peter Lee (李忠琛; 1939–2008), engineer and former director of the Hong Kong Observatory; son of Lee Hoi-chuen and brother of Robert Lee and Bruce Lee
- Arthur Li (李國章; born 1945), surgeon and former Vice-Chancellor of the Chinese University of Hong Kong
- Gary Yia Lee (born 1949), Laos-born Hmong anthropologist
- Fuk Li (李復國; born 1953), Director of the Mars Exploration Directorate at NASA's Jet Propulsion Laboratory
- Victor Li (born c. 1953), Hong Kong-American civil engineer and professor
- Lee Wei Ling (李玮玲; born 1955), neurologist and former director of the National Neuroscience Institute; daughter of Lee Kuan Yew and sister of Lee Hsien Loong and Lee Hsien Yang
- Heidi Li Feldman (born c. 1962), American law professor
- Song Li (李松; born c. 1966), Chinese-American bioengineer and professor
- Yueh-Ting Lee (黎岳庭; born c. 1970s), social and evolutionary psychologist and professor
- Guofang Li (born 1972), Chinese-Canadian professor of education
- Zan Li (李赞, born 1975), Chinese communications engineer and professor
- Runze Li (born c. 1970s), American statistician and professor
- Li Wenliang (李文亮; 1986–2020), Chinese ophthalmologist who warned about the COVID-19 pandemic in late 2019
- Li Xinchuan (李心傳; 1167–1244), Song dynasty historian

== Sport ==
- Lee Wai Tong (李惠堂; 1905–1979), Hong Kong and Chinese football player, manager and former Vice President of FIFA
- Li Cunxin (李存信; born 1961), Chinese-Australian artistic director of the Queensland Ballet and retired ballet dancer
- Li Huirong (李惠荣; born 1965), Chinese retired triple jumper
- Lee Lai Shan (李麗珊; born 1970), Hong Kong former windsurfer and Olympian
- Li Tie (李铁; born 1977), Chinese football manager and former footballer
- Li Na (李娜; born 1982), Chinese former tennis player and Olympian
- Lee Chong Wei (李宗伟; born 1982), Malaysian former badminton player and 2008, 2012, and 2016 Olympian
- Li Zhe (李喆; born 1986), Chinese tennis player
- Li Xiaoxia (李晓霞; born 1988), Chinese table tennis player and former 2012 and 2016 Olympian gold medalist
- Haku Ri (李博; born 1990), Japanese volleyball player
- Li Hang (李行; born 1990), Chinese former professional snooker player
- Isabelle Li (born 1994), Singaporean table tennis player
- Lee Chih-kai (李智凯; born 1996), Taiwanese gymnast and Olympian
- Lee Zii Jia (李梓嘉; born 1998), Malaysian badminton player and 2024 Olympian
- Li Yueru (李月汝; born 1999), Chinese professional basketball player
- Kerong Li (李科蓉; born 2001), Chinese racing driver
- Li Cai-xuan (born 2004), Taiwanese archer

== Visual art ==
- Li Yin (李因; c. 1610–1685), Chinese painter, poet, and calligrapher during the late Ming and early Qing dynasties
- Li Hua (李桦; 1907–1994), artist and communist activist

== Other ==
- The Lee family of Singapore
- Li Ching-Yuen (李清雲; died 1933), a Chinese herbalist and practitioner of Qigong who claimed to be more than 250 years old
- Susur Lee (李國緯; born 1958), Hong Kong-Canadian celebrity chef
- Yangjie Li (李洋洁; 1990–2016), Chinese architecture student at Anhalt University of Applied Sciences murdered in Germany
- Aiiso Yufeng Li, nanoengineer, founder and CSO of CorDx Union
