= List of family of Wu Zetian =

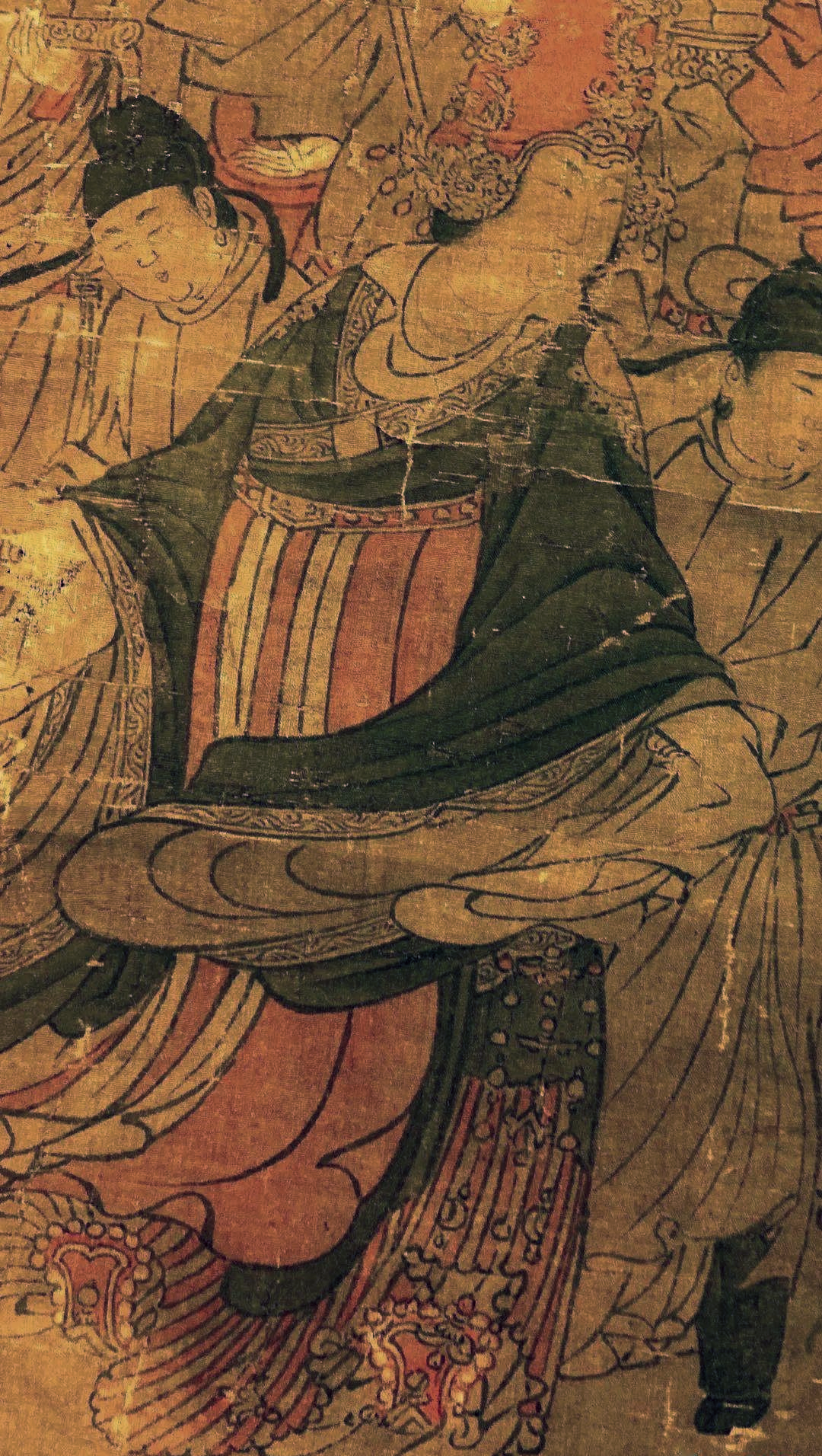
Wu Zetian

The following is a list of the relatives of Wu Zetian, the only empress regnant recognized in orthodox Chinese historiography, a late 7th and early 8th century ruler of China and the sole emperor of the Wu Zhou dynasty.

== Paternal Ancestors ==
These are Wu Zetian's paternal ancestors.

- Great-Great-Great-Grandfather
  - Wu Keji (武克已), posthumously honored as Emperor Cheng 成皇帝 (with the temple name of Yanzu 嚴祖)
- Great-Great-Great-Grandmother
  - Lady Pei, Wu Keji's wife, posthumously honored as Empress Chengzhuang (成莊皇后)
- Great-Great-Grandfather
  - Wu Juchang (武居常), posthumously honored as Emperor Zhangjing 章敬皇帝 (with the temple name of Suzu 肅祖)
- Great-Great-Grandmother
  - Lady Liu, Wu Juichang's wife, posthumously honored as Empress Zhangjing (章敬皇后)
- Great-Grandfather
  - Wu Jian (武儉), posthumously honored as Emperor Zhao'an 昭安皇帝 (with the temple name of Liezu 烈祖)
- Great-grandmother
  - Lady Song, Wu Jian's wife, posthumously honored as Empress Zhao'an (昭安皇后)
- Grandfather
  - Wu Hua (武華), posthumously honored as Emperor Wenmu 文穆皇帝 (with the temple name of Xianzu 顯祖), sired 4 sons.
- Grandmother
  - Lady Zhao, Wu Hua's wife, posthumously honored as Empress Wenmu (文穆皇后)

== Immediate Family ==
- Father: Wu Shihuo (武士彠) (559 - 635), 4th son of Wu Hua, Duke Ding of Ying, later further successively posthumously honored as the Duke of Zhou, the Prince of Taiyuan, King Zhongxiao (忠孝王), and Emperor Wushangxiaominggao 無上孝明高皇帝 (with the temple name of Taizu 太祖)
  x Lady Xiangli (相里氏), first wife.
  - 1st Elder Half-brother:Wu Yuanqing (武元庆)
    - Half-Nephew:Wu Sansi (武三思).
      - Half-Grandnephew:Wu Chongxun (武崇训), married Princess Anle with one son Wu Jizhi.
      - Half-Grandnephews:Wu Chonglie (武崇烈), Wu Chongqian (武崇谦), Wu Chongwei (武崇㧑), Wu Chongcao (武崇操).
      - Half-Grandnieces: three, married Yan Zexian (阎则先), Xue Chongjian (薛崇简), Pei Guangting (裴光庭) separately.
  - 2nd Elder Half-brother:Wu Yuanshuang (武元爽)
    - Half-Nephew:Wu Chengsi (武承嗣)
      - Half-Grandnephew:Wu Yanji (武延基) (?—701), married his half second cousin, Wu Zetian's granddaughter Li Xianhui (李仙蕙), Princess Yongtai (永泰公主).
      - Half-Grandnephew:Wu Yanxiu (武延秀) (?—710), married his half second cousin, Wu Zetian's granddaughter Princess Anle (安乐公主).
      - Half-Grandnephew:Wu Yanyi (武延义).
      - Half-Grandnephew:Wu Yan'an (武延安).
      - Half-Grandnephew:Wu Yanguang (武延光).
      - Half-Grandniece: Lady Wu, married Zheng Keyi (郑克义).

x Mother: Lady Yang (杨氏, 579 - 3 October 670), Wu Shihuo's second wife, daughter of Yang Da (杨达, 551 - 612) (Wu Zetian's maternal grandfather), honored as the Lady of Rong (荣国夫人), Lady of Zuan, Lady of Wei (卫国夫人), and finally Lady Zhonglie of Lu, later further successively posthumously honored with titles corresponding to Wu Shihuo's; she came from the aristocratic Yang family of the Hong Nong region and was of the same clan as the imperial family of the Sui dynasty. Her father's older brother was Yang Xiong (楊雄), the father of Yang Gongren and Yang Shidao. Yang Da had another 1 daughter and 2 sons, his other female descendants married into Wu and Li family.

  - Elder Sister: Wu Shun (武顺) (623—October 665), Honored as Lady of Han, after her husband died, she committed adultery with Emperor Gaozong, and allegedly poisoned by her sister Wu Zetian.
    x Helan Yueshi (贺兰越石)
    - Nephew:Helan Minzhi (贺兰敏之) (642－671), Has raped Li Hong's first fiancée, later committed incest with grandmother Lady Yang.
      x Lady Yang, Lady of Hongnong County
      - Grandnephew: Helan Wan (贺兰琬)
    - Niece: Lady Helan (?-September 666), honored Lady of Wei, also committed adultery with Emperor Gaozong, and poisoned by her aunt Wu Zetian.
  - Younger Sister: Lady Wu, married Guo Xiaoshen (郭孝慎).

== Imperial Household ==
- Husband
  - Emperor Taizong of Tang, as his concubine, later daughter-in-law.
  - Emperor Gaozong of Tang, 3rd son of Emperor Taizong and his wife Empress Zhangsun, first as his concubine, later his 2nd wife.
- Major known lovers
  - Huaiyi, né Feng Xiaobao (馮小寶) (name changed 685), the Duke of Liang (created 688) then the Duke of E (created 690, killed 695)
  - Shen Nanqiu (沈南璆), imperial physician
  - Zhang Yizhi, the Duke of Heng (created 702, killed 705)
  - Zhang Changzong, the Duke of Ye (created 702, killed 705)

== Descendants ==
- 1st Son: Li Hong (李弘) (652-675), originally the Prince of Dai (created 653), later the Crown Prince (created 656, poisoned 675), posthumously honored Emperor Xiaojing with the temple name Yizong, traditionally believed to be murdered by his own mother Wu Zetian.
  x Lady Pei (Wife), daughter of Pei Judao (裴居道), no issue.
- 1st Daughter: Princess Si of Anding (born and died 654), traditionally supposed to be murdered by Emperor Gaozong's first wife Empress Wang, also traditionally believed to be murdered by her own mother Wu Zetian.
- 2nd Son: Li Xián (李賢) (note different tone than his brother) (655-684), name changed to Li De (李德) 672, changed back to Li Xián 674, originally the Prince of Lu (created 655), later the Prince of Pei (created 661), later the Prince of Yong (created 672), later the Crown Prince (created 675), later demoted to commoner rank (demoted 680, forced to commit suicide by own mother Wu Zetian 684), posthumously initially honored the Prince of Yong, later honored Crown Prince Zhanghuai.
  x Lady Fang (Wife), granddaughter of Fang Renyu (房仁裕)
  - Li Guangshun (李光顺)
  - Li Shouyi (李守义)

x Lady Zhang (Concubine)

  - Li Shouli (李守礼), (672-741), has about 60 children sired by different consorts.
    - Li Chengning (李承宁)
    - Li Chenghong (李承宏)
    - Li Chengcai (李承寀)
    - Princess Jincheng (金城公主), (698-739), married as consort of Trisong Detsen's father Me Agtsom.
- 3rd Son: Li Xiǎn (李顯) (note different tone than his brother) (656-710), name changed to Li Zhe (李哲) 677, changed back to Li Xiǎn 698, changed to Wu Xian (武顯) 700, changed back to Li Xian 705, initially the Prince of Zhou (created 656), later the Prince of Ying (created 677), later the Crown Prince (created 680), later Emperor Zhongzong of Tang (enthroned 684), later demoted to Prince of Luling (demoted 684), later the Crown Prince (created 698), later emperor again (705)
  x Empress Zhao (1st Wife), daughter of Gaozong's aunt, Princess Changle (常乐公主) and her husband Zhao Gui (赵瑰), murdered by Wu Zetian, no issue.
  x Empress Wei (2nd Wife)
  - Li Chongrun (李重润)(682-701), murdered by Wu Zetian.
  - Princess Changning (长宁公主)
    x Yang Shenjiao (杨慎交) (675-724), Wu Zetian's granduncle Yang Xiong's great-great-grandson.
    x Su Yanbo (苏彦伯), with whom no issue.
    - Yang Hui (杨洄), married Princess Xianyi (咸宜公主).
  - Princess Yongtai (永泰公主), named Li Xianhui (李仙蕙) (684-701), murdered by Wu Zetian, married Wu Yanji (武延基).
  - Princess Yongshou (永寿公主) (?-?), died young.
  - Princess Anle (安乐公主) (685-710), presumably Li Guo'er (李裹儿) married Wu Chongxun (武崇训) with one son Wu Jizhi (武继植), later married Wu Yanxiu (武延秀), without issue.

x Shangguan Wan'er (上官婉儿) (Concubine), rank Zhao Rong (昭容), no issue.
x Other Consorts

  - Li Chongfu (李重福) (680-710).
  - Li Chongjun (李重俊) (?-707).
  - Li Chongmao (李重茂) (695－714), Emperor Shang.
  - Princess Xindu (新都公主), married Wu Yanhui (武延辉).
  - Princess Yicheng (宜城公主), married Pei Xun (裴巽).
  - Princess Ding'an (定安公主) (?-733), married three times, son Wang Yao (王繇) with Wang Tongjiao (王同皎), whom married Princess Yongmu (永穆公主). son Wei Zhuo (韦濯) with Wei Hui (韦会), third husband is Cui Xian (崔铣).
  - Princess Cheng'an (成安公主), married Wei Jie (韦捷), their daughter Princess Dongguang (东光公主), married Li Lusu (李鲁苏), leader of Xi tribe.
- 4th Son: Li Dan (李旦), né Li Xulun (李旭輪) (662-716), name changed to Li Lun (李輪) 669, changed again to Li Dan 678, changed again to Wu Lun (武輪) 690, changed again to Wu Dan (武旦) 698, changed back to Li Dan 705, originally the Prince of Yin (created 662), later the Prince of Yu (created 666), later the Prince of Ji (created 669), later the Prince of Xiang (created 675), later the Prince of Yu (created 678), later Emperor Ruizong of Tang (enthroned 684), later demoted to Crown Prince (demoted 690), later demoted to Prince of Xiang (demoted 698), later emperor again (710)
  x Empress Liu, (?-693), Liu Dewei (刘德威)'s granddaughter (Wife)
  - Li Xian (李宪) (679-742), originally crown prince.
  - Princess Shouchang (寿昌公主), married Cui Zhen (崔真).
  - Princess Daiguo (代国公主), married Zhen Wanjun (郑万钧).

x Virtuous Consort Dou (Major concubine) (?-693), Dou Xiaozhan (窦孝谌)'s daughter, later honored empress by her son.

  - Emperor Xuanzong of Tang (685-762), name Li Longji (李隆基)
    - Number of consorts and children are large, see Emperor Xuanzong of Tang.
  - Princess Jinxian (金仙公主) (689-732), Taoist nun.
  - Princess Yuzhen (玉真公主) (692-762), Taoist nun.

x Noble Consort Doulu (豆卢), Li Longji's adoptive mother x Lady Liu, Liu Shi (柳奭)'s granddaughter

  - Li Zong (李捴)

x Lady Cui

  - Li Fan (李范) (686-726)

x Virtuous Consort Wang

  - Li Ye (李业)
  - Princess Huaiyang (淮阳公主), married Wang Chengqing (王承庆).
  - Princess Liangguo (凉国公主), married Xue Boyang (薛伯阳) as second wife.

x Worthy Consort Wang, Virtuous Consort Wang's younger sister, raised her children.
x Noble Consort Cui

  - Princess Xiguo (鄎国公主), married Xun Jing (薛儆), having son Xue Nian (薛谂), later remarried Zhen Xiaoyi (郑孝义).

x Other consorts

  - Li Longti (李隆悌) (692-702)
  - Princess Huoguo (霍国公主), married Pei Xuji (裴虚己), later forced divorce.
  - Princess Jinshan (荆山公主), married Xue Boyang (薛伯阳) as first wife.
- 2nd Daughter: Princess Taiping (665-713), name presumably Li Lingyue (李令月).
  x Xue Shao (薛绍), son of Princess Chengyang (城阳公主)
  - Xue Chongxun (薛崇训)
  - Lady Xue
  - Lady Xue, Lady of County Wanquan (万泉县主) (686-710), son Doulu Jian (豆卢建) married Princess Jianping (建平公主).
  - Xue Chongjian (薛崇简) (688-724)

x Wu Youji (武攸暨) (663-712), grandson of Wu Zetian's uncle Wu Shirang (武士让)

  - Wu Chongmin (武崇敏)
  - Wu Chongxing (武崇行)
  - Lady Wu, Lady of County Yonghe (永和县主)
