= Secret History of Empress Wu =

2011 Chinese TV series

- Poster
- 武则天秘史
- Genre: Historical drama
- Written by: Zhao Ruiyong; Wang Biao; Zhou Su; Luo Ye
- Directed by: Cheng Feng
- Presented by: Ouyang Changlin; Zhao Ruiyong; Zhang Huali; Liu Xiangqun; Liu Yuping
- Starring: Yin Tao; Liu Xiaoqing; Siqin Gaowa; Yu Shaoqun; Winston Chao; Tang Guoqiang; Xu Huangli; Zheng Shuang; Gillian Chung; Qin Hailu; Jiang Linjing; Liu Peiqi; Guo Qiming; Lei Lei
- Opening theme: "Who Else Besides Me" (舍我其谁)
- Ending theme: "An Extraordinary Life" (传奇人生) by Jin Lin
- Composer: Yao Jiejun
- Country of origin: China
- Original language: Mandarin
- No. of episodes: 50

Production
- Executive producers: Li Hao; Yao Jia; Hou Lin; Zhang Chengdong; He Xiaoting; Xiao Ning
- Producers: Zhao Ruijun; Zhao Ruiyong; Jiang Linjing
- Production locations: Wuxi; Hengdian World Studios
- Cinematography: Chen Mingqi; Yang Yulai; Tian Yaming; Ma Hanbin
- Editor: Wang Qian
- Running time: ≈45 minutes per episode
- Production companies: Hunan Broadcasting System; Hunan Satellite TV; Zhejiang Changcheng Film and Television Media Group

Original release
- Network: Hunan Satellite TV
- Release: 5 November 2011

Related
- Secret History of Princess Taiping (2012)

Secret History of Empress Wu (武则天秘史) is a Chinese historical television series based on the life of Wu Zetian, the only female emperor in Chinese history. The series was directed by Cheng Feng and starred three actresses — Yin Tao, Liu Xiaoqing and Siqin Gaowa — as Wu Zetian, each portraying the emperor at a different stage in her life. It was first broadcast in mainland China on Hunan Satellite TV on 5 November 2011.

== Synopsis ==
Wu Meiniang enters the palace at the age of 14 to be Emperor Taizong's concubine after her father courageously sacrificed his life to protect the emperor during war. Emperor Taizong is soon told that a woman surnamed Wu is destined to bring disaster to the Tang dynasty, so he refuses to let her enter his bedchamber. Wu Meiniang is neglected for 12 years. Emperor Taizong eventually falls sick and warns his son Li Zhi to secretly kill her. Wu Meiniang finds out and seduces Li Zhi in order to live. After Emperor Taizong's death, she is forced to be a Buddhist nun while most other concubines are killed and buried. She shaves her head and is ridiculed by the other nuns.

Li Zhi becomes the new emperor as Emperor Gaozong. Zhangsun Wuji, Li Zhi's maternal uncle, wields much power, making Emperor Gaozong a figurehead ruler. Li Zhi is displeased with his wife Empress Wang for being too controlling and jealous of his favourite concubine, Consort Xiao. Yet, he cannot forget the affair he had with Wu Meiniang. Empress Wang decides to bring back Wu Meiniang to make Consort Xiao jealous and regain the emperor's favour. She fails, and Wu Meiniang ends up reuniting with the emperor. Both Empress Wang and Consort Xiao become jealous and desperately want to get rid of Wu Meiniang. Wu Meiniang gives birth to her first son, Li Hong, and is promoted to imperial consort. She also gives birth to a daughter, Princess Anding. Being frequently harmed by her enemies since she entered the palace, she realises that to survive, she needs to be empress and help the emperor wipe out all their enemies, including Zhangsun Wuji, who frequently manipulates the emperor. She strangles her newborn daughter and frames Empress Wang for the murder. Emperor Gaozong wants to depose the empress, but Zhangsun Wuji opposes. The case is terminated.

Wu Meiniang is ambitious and she further accuses both Empress Wang and Consort Xiao of witchcraft. Emperor Gaozong is angered and he strips both Empress Wang and Consort Xiao of their titles and banishes them to the cold palace. On Wu Meiniang's orders, Empress Wang and Consort Xiao are beaten to death, have their hands and feet cut off, and drowned in wine jars after they intend to take revenge. Wu Meiniang also removes Zhangsun Wuji from office, and he commits suicide in exile. Wu Meiniang is elevated to the position of empress. She gives birth to four more children: three sons and a daughter. Her life as empress is peaceful until her sister, the Lady of Han, returns to the palace.

The Lady of Han is Wu Meiniang's older sister who was widowed at an early age. She has two children, Helan Minzhi and Helan Minyue, from her marriage and often visits the palace. She used to have a close relationship with Wu Meiniang, but the Lady of Han decides to seduce Emperor Gaozong when Wu Meiniang was still a consort. The Lady of Han craves affection and wants to be the empress and replace her younger sister, even wishing for her sister's death. Soon, the Lady of Han is pregnant with Emperor Gaozong's child. Accusing the Lady of Han of plotting to harm her, Wu Meiniang poisons her sister and her unborn child.

Helan Minyue suspects something fishy about her mother's death, believing that Empress Wu is the murderer. She gains the trust of Emperor Gaozong and wants to become empress to replace her aunt, convincing the emperor to depose the empress. As Emperor Gaozong is about to issue an edict to depose the empress, Wu Meiniang rushes in and makes the emperor take pity on her. Emperor Gaozong changes his mind and pushes the blame to Shangguan Yi, ordering the execution of the entire Shangguan family except for Shangguan Yi's granddaughter Shangguan Wan'er. Shangguan Wan'er becomes Wu Meiniang's secretary and gets into a romantic relationship with two of her sons.

Angered by Wu Meiniang's machinations, Helan Minyue unites with Wu Meiniang's cousins and plots to kill her aunt to avenge her mother. They invite Wu Meiniang to a family dinner, spike the food with poison, and plan to burn down the palace to kill her. However, Wu Meiniang sees through her cousins and niece's plot, so she forces Helan Minyue to consume the food and orders the execution of her cousins. After Helan Minyue's death, her brother Helan Minzhi decides to take his sister's place and kill Wu Meiniang, but he is later exiled and killed.

Wu Meiniang exiles all the officials who oppose her, replacing them with her allies. Her sons also turn against her out of fear that she will usurp the throne from the ruling Li family. They fail and three of them are forced to commit suicide, exiled or poisoned. The deaths of Emperor Gaozong of Tang and Wu Meiniang's three sons sparks outrage from the officials, who insist that a woman like Wu Meiniang is not allowed to rule. They are eventually defeated and removed from power. Wu Meiniang's youngest son ultimately obeys his mother, yielding the throne to her. Now a widow, Wu Meiniang establishes her own dynasty to replace the Tang dynasty, becoming the first and only female emperor in Chinese history.

== Cast ==
- Yin Tao as Wu Zetian (young adult)
- Liu Xiaoqing as Wu Zetian (middle age)
- Siqin Gaowa as Wu Zetian (old age)
- Yu Shaoqun as Li Zhi (Emperor Gaozong) (young adult)
- Winston Chao as Li Zhi (middle age)
- Tang Guoqiang as Li Shimin (Emperor Taizong)
- Xu Huangli as Princess Taiping (teenager)
- Zheng Shuang as Princess Taiping (adult)
- Gillian Chung as Shangguan Wan'er
- Qin Hailu as the Lady of Han
- Jiang Linjing as Empress Wang
- Liu Peiqi as Shangguan Yi
- Guo Qiming as Xu Jingzong
- Lei Lei as Li Xian
- Kathy Yuen as Helan Minyue
- Shen Junyi as Zhangsun Wuji
- Li Na as Consort Xiao
- Zhou Xuan as Li Hong (teenager)
- Yuan Jiabao as Li Hong (adult)
- Wang Hao as Li Xian)
- Tian Yupeng as Li Dan
- Liu Changde as Helan Minzhi
- Chen Jiming as Di Renjie
- Yang Hongwu as Pei Yan
- Zhang Bojun as Li Yifu
- Ding Chong as Deguan
- Ren Xihong as Wu Shihuo
- Chen Bing as Chu Suiliang
- Lu Xiaojuan as Princess Danyang
- Li Tingzhe as Zhao Daosheng
- Hu Gaofeng as Luo Binwang
- Bai Jincheng as Wang Fusheng
- Dong Yanlin as Xu Jingye
- Wu Youxi as Eunuch Liu
- Yang Yijia as Pei Wanying
- Ding Jialan as Wei Lian'er

== Production ==
The series was co-produced by Hunan Broadcasting System, Hunan Satellite TV, and Zhejiang Changcheng Film and Television Media Group, with a budget of 60 million yuan. Shooting started on 18 February 2011 and ended on 6 May in the same year. Filming locations include Wuxi and the Hengdian World Studios.

== See also ==
- Secret History of Princess Taiping
