= Wei Siqian =

Wei Siqian (韋思謙) (611–689), formal name Wei Renyue (韋仁約) but went by the courtesy name of Siqian, formally Baron of Bochang (博昌男), was an official of the Chinese Tang dynasty, serving as chancellor during the first reign of Emperor Ruizong. His sons Wei Chengqing and Wei Sili later served as chancellors as well.

== Background ==
Wei Siqian was born in 611, and it was known that his family was from Zheng Prefecture (鄭州, roughly modern Zhengzhou, Henan). At some point, he passed the imperial examination and thereafter was made the magistrate of Yingcheng County (應城, in modern Xiaogan, Hubei). After serving for more than a year, he was up for performance review to be considered for a higher position. The reviews, conducted by the ministry of civil service affairs, were initially not positive, as Wei was said to have allowed some of his official business to be delayed and was unfamiliar with old regulations. The minister of civil service affairs, Gao Jifu, however, commented, "Since I took over the ministry, I have only met this one man who is truly talented. How can I abandon his great virtues on account of small faults?" He promoted Wei to be a censor, and Wei became known after this selection. While serving as censor, he once commented, "If a censor leaves the capital [(i.e., to investigate cases)], he would be amiss in his duties if he did not shake the mountains and shock the prefectures and counties."

== During Emperor Gaozong's reign ==
In 650, Wei Siqian accused the powerful chancellor Chu Suiliang of forcing a government interpreter to sell his land to Chu. Initially, the deputy chief judge of the supreme court, Zhang Ruice (張叡冊), ruled that Chu had broken no laws because he had paid compensation to the interpreter, but Wei pointed out to Emperor Gaozong that Chu had paid just the amount of compensation equal to government condemnation of the property, not fair market value, and Emperor Gaozong demoted Chu to the post of prefect of Tong Prefecture (同州, roughly modern Weinan, Shaanxi). However, Emperor Gaozong respected Chu and recalled him to be a chancellor again in 652, after which Wei could not be promoted and was at one point demoted to the post of magistrate of Qingshui County (清水, in modern Tianshui, Gansu). Despite this, however, he commented:

I have a reckless disposition, and if I wield power, I will use it in that manner. This is enough to bring disaster to myself. However, where a man should be firm, he should be brave, with his eyes open, in order to repay the empire for its grace. One should not be just an ordinary bureaucrat in order to protect one's wife and children.

At one point, the official Huangfu Gongyi (皇甫公義) became the secretary general for Emperor Gaozong's son Li Xian the Prince of Pei, and he invited Wei to serve as Li Xian's treasurer. He stated to Wei, "You, sir, are not just a small fish in the pond, but I would like to ask you to serve for a few years to watch out for the foundation of this princely mansion." Eventually, he was promoted to be a secretary at the executive bureau of government (尚書省, Shangshu Sheng).

Early in Emperor Gaozong's Yongchun era (682–683), Wei served as Shangshu Zuo Cheng (尚書左丞), one of the two secretaries general of the executive bureau, and then as imperial censor. At that time, the general Tian Renhui (田仁會) had a dispute with Wei's subordinate Zhang Renyi (張仁禕) and falsely accused Zhang of crimes. Emperor Gaozong personally interrogated Zhang, and Zhang, fearful of the emperor, was unable to respond coherently. Wei instead spoke:

I have served with Zhang Renyi for some time, and I know what the situation is. Zhang Renyi is timid and unable to speak for himself. If Tian Renhui has deluded Your Imperial Majesty and accused Zhang Renyi of terrible crimes, then this also means that I have not served the emperor well. Please allow me to speak.

Wei's subsequent defense of Zhang was eloquent, and Emperor Gaozong was impressed. While he served as censor, he would not bow to princes or dukes, and when some people pointed out that this might bring him trouble, he stated: "Eagles [(often used as a symbol of censors to show that their functions are to look out for illegalities)] are not friends of all birds. Why should I bow to them to ingratiate them? Further, officials who serve as ears and eyes of the emperor should be independent of others."

== During Empress Dowager Wu's regency ==
Emperor Gaozong died in 683 and was succeeded by his son Li Zhe the Crown Prince (as Emperor Zhongzong), but power was in the hands of Emperor Gaozong's wife Empress Wu (later known as Wu Zetian), as empress dowager and regent. In 684, when Emperor Zhongzong showed signs of independence, she deposed him and replaced him with his brother Li Dan the Prince of Yu (as Emperor Ruizong), but thereafter held onto power even more firmly. Early in her regency, Wei Siqian was made the minister of imperial clan affairs, and later in 684, when she divided the imperial censor's office into two—one in charge of reviewing central government affairs and one in charge of reviewing local government affairs—Wei was made the imperial censor in charge of reviewing local government affairs. Based on tradition, the imperial censors and their assistant censors would accept each other's greetings, as equals, but after Wei's commission, he stopped greeting his subordinates as equals, and when asked why, he stated, "The imperial government has its proper structure, and I am their superior. Why should I follow tradition just because it is tradition?" In 685, he was created the Baron of Bochang, and he was also given the designation Tong Fengge Luantai Sanpin (同鳳閣鸞臺三品), making him a chancellor de facto. In 686, he became Nayan (納言) -- the head of the examination bureau of government and a post considered one for a chancellor—taking over for Su Liangsi. In 687, he requested retirement on account of old age. Empress Dowager Wu agreed and allowed him to retire, bestowing on him the honorific title Taizhong Daifu (太中大夫). He died at his home in 689.

== Sons ==
Besides the two sons who would become chancellors in future, Wei had a third son named Wei Shu (韦淑), who served as Military Governor of An (安州都督).

== Notes and references ==
- Old Book of Tang, vol. 88.
- New Book of Tang, vol. 116.
- Zizhi Tongjian, vols. 199, 203, 204.
