= Consort Liu (Gaozong) =

Consort of emperor gaozong of tang

- Born: unknown
- Died: unknown
- Spouse: Emperor Gaozong of Tang
- Issue: Li Zhong

Liu Gongren (Chinese: 劉宮人; lit. 'Palace Lady Liu'; ? ― ?) was a concubine of Emperor Gaozong of the Tang dynasty in China. She was the mother of Emperor Gaozong's eldest son, Li Zhong, who later became the crown prince of the Tang dynasty. Despite her low birth, her son became the crown prince. It was rare for a prince of such low birth, the son of a palace maid, to be appointed crown prince.

== Life ==
While Lady Liu's personal background and the circumstances surrounding her entry into the imperial palace remain unclear, historical records indicate that she was a palace maid of Prince Li Zhi (later Emperor Gaozong) and held the title of "concubine" (fei), a rank within the imperial harem.

In the year 643 CE, during the 17th year of the Zhenguan reign, shortly after ascending to the position of crown prince, Li Zhi had his first son with her, Li Zhong. Emperor Taizong, the reigning emperor and Li Zhi's father, expressed his elation by declaring, "Upon receiving this grandson, I want to share the joy with everyone," and he was so happy that he started dancing.

Following the birth of her son, Lady Liu's presence in historical records fades away. There is no mention of whether she received any further titles or honors after Emperor Gaozong's ascension to the throne.

In the absence of a male heir, Empress Wang, Emperor Gaozong's empress, faced pressure to secure the succession. Her uncle, the chancellor Liu Shi, suggested adopting Li Zhong as the crown prince because Lady Liu came from a lowly background, and Liu Shi hoped Li Zhong would be close to Empress Wang. Thus, Li Zhong was made the crown prince. This proposal likely stemmed from Liu Shi's hope that Li Zhong's elevation would strengthen his own position and influence within the court. Later, after Emperor Gaozong deposed Empress Wang and established his concubine Wu Zetian as empress, Li Zhong was demoted to the Prince of Liang. However, due to political maneuvering and favoritism, Emperor Gaozong eventually designated his third son, Li Hong, as the crown prince and successor to the throne.

== In media ==
- Portrayed by Jian Lifang in 1985 Chinese drama The Empress of the Dynasty
- Portrayed by Cui Bing in 2014 Chinese drama The Empress of China
