= Li Han =

Li Han may refer to:

- Li Han, brother-in-law (husband of younger sister) of Li Te, who laid the foundations of the state of Cheng-Han
- Li Han (Jin dynasty), Western Jin official
- Emperor Wenzong of Tang (809–840), né Li Han, emperor of the Tang Dynasty of China
- Li Han (aviator), Chinese Korean War flying ace
- Li Han (judoka) (born 1987), Chinese judoka

== See also ==
- Han Li
