= Emperor Xiaojing =

Emperor Xiaojing may refer to:

- Emperor Jing of Han (188–141 BC, reigned 157–141 BC), also known as Emperor Xiaojing (孝景皇帝)
- Emperor Xiaojing of Eastern Wei (孝靜皇帝, 524–552, reigned 534–550)
- Li Hong (652–675), crown prince of the Tang dynasty, posthumously honored as Emperor Xiaojing (孝敬皇帝)
