= Li Hang =

Li Hang is the name of:

- Li Hang (footballer) (李行, born 1989), Chinese association footballer
- Li Hang (snooker player) (李行, born 1990), Chinese snooker player

== See also ==
- Li Gang (Song dynasty) (李綱, 1083–1140), regional commander serving the Southern Song dynasty in the 1130s
- Li Hang Wui (born 1985), Hong Kong footballer
- Li Hsing (李行, 1930–2012) Taiwanese film director, whose Chinese name is exactly the same as the footballer and snooker player
- Li (surname 利)
- List of people with surname Li
