= Shangguan Yi =

Chinese poet and politician

Chinese name
- Traditional Chinese: 上官儀
- Simplified Chinese: 上官仪
Transcriptions
Standard Mandarin
- Hanyu Pinyin: Shàngguān Yí
- Wade–Giles: Shang-kuan Yi
Yue: Cantonese
- Jyutping: Soeng^{6}-gun^{1} Ji^{4}
Middle Chinese
- Middle Chinese: Źjang^{C}-kwân Ngje

Japanese name
- Kanji: 上官儀
- Hiragana: じょうかん ぎ
Transcriptions
- Romanization: Jyōkan Gi

Shangguan Yi (Chinese: 上官儀; 608 – 4 January 665 (Note: It was implied in the accounts regarding Shangguan's death that he was arrested and killed on the same day, but it could have been that he was merely arrested on 4 January 665, and not executed until sometime later. See Zizhi Tongjian, vol. 201 and New Book of Tang, vol. 61.)), courtesy name Youshao (游韶), (Note: One of Shangguan's posthumous honours was Duke of Chu (楚國公), but he was not given a posthumous name.) was a Chinese poet and politician. He was an official of the Chinese Tang dynasty, serving as chancellor during the reign of Emperor Gaozong. In 664, Emperor Gaozong was displeased with his wife Empress Wu (later known as Wu Zetian) for her controlling behavior, and grew resentful of her controlling influence in the empire. Shangguan proposed to Emperor Gaozong that Empress Wu be deposed. The emperor was initially receptive to this proposal, but disavowed it once Empress Wu discovered the plot. Empress Wu then had Shangguan accused of plotting treason with Emperor Gaozong's oldest son, the former crown prince Li Zhong (who was displaced by Empress Wu's son Li Hong), and Shangguan was executed. Empress Wu then began to attend state assemblies and to oversee the emperor's actions and decisions, hearing all the details of the government and obvious intervening in the government. Shangguan's granddaughter Shangguan Wan'er later served as a key secretary to Empress Wu and a beloved concubine to her son Emperor Zhongzong.

== Background ==
Shangguan Yi was born in 608. His family was initially from what would eventually become Shan Prefecture (陝州, roughly modern Sanmenxia, Henan), but as his father Shangguan Hong (上官弘) served as the deputy director of Emperor Yang of Sui's palace at the secondary capital Jiangdu (江都, in modern Yangzhou, Jiangsu), the Shangguan household relocated to Jiangdu and settled there.

Late in Emperor Yang's Daye era (605–618), Shangguan Hong was killed by the general Chen Leng (陳稜). Shangguan Yi was still young at the time, and he escaped death by going into hiding. Thereafter, he became a Buddhist monk and spent much time on studying the sutras. He also studied the Confucian classics, and was said to be literarily talented.

== During Emperor Taizong's reign ==
Early in the reign of succeeding the Tang dynasty's second emperor Emperor Taizong, Yang Gongren was serving as the acting commandant at Yang Prefecture (揚州, i.e., Jiangdu), when Yang became impressed with Shangguan's talents and recommended him for the imperial examination. Emperor Taizong also heard of Shangguan's talent and made him an imperial scholar and later an official at the archival bureau. As Emperor Taizong himself liked to write, he often had Shangguan review his drafts and also write responses to them; he also often invited Shangguan to imperial feasts. Shangguan also participated in the writing of the Book of Jin, the official history of the Jin dynasty (266–420), a project led by the chancellor Fang Xuanling. After the project was complete, he became an imperial historian and was awarded with linen.

== During Emperor Gaozong's reign ==
After Emperor Taizong's death in 649, Emperor Taizong's son Li Zhi became emperor (as Emperor Gaozong). Sometime thereafter, he made Shangguan Yi the deputy director of the archival bureau. In 662, he promoted Shangguan to be Xi Tai Shilang (西臺侍郎), the deputy head of the legislative bureau of government (西臺, Xi Tai), along with the honorific title Yinqing Guanglu Daifu (銀青光祿大夫). He also gave Shangguan the designation Tong Dong Xi Tai Sanpin (同東西臺三品), making him a chancellor de facto. It was said that Shangguan was by now particularly known for his poetry, particularly a style featuring five characters per line; his poetry was said to be decorated and delicate—a style that was then often imitated and became known as the Shangguan Style. It was said that Shangguan was arrogant because of his talent and became the object of much jealousy.

By 664, Emperor Gaozong was said to be deeply fearful and resentful of his powerful second wife Empress Wu, as she interfered too much every day with his decisions and took many of the imperial orders arbitrarily against his will. After the eunuch Wang Fusheng (王伏勝) reported to Emperor Gaozong that Empress Wu had, against strict regulations, engaged the Taoist monk Guo Xinzhen (郭行真) to engage in sorcery, Emperor Gaozong was angry, and he summoned Shangguan to ask for advice on what to do. Shangguan suggested, "The empress has no control of herself, and the entire empire is dissatisfied with her. Please depose her." Emperor Gaozong agreed and had Shangguan draft an edict deposing her. However, because among Emperor Gaozong's attendants were her allies, she found out, and she immediately entered the great palace with the soldiers in an authoritarian manner appeared before him to defend herself. As Emperor Gaozong was caught red-handed with the draft edict in his hand, Emperor Gaozong was scared and ashamed, and he reconciled with her. He further blamed Shangguan for the idea, to divert Empress Wu's displeasure. (Note: Shangguan Yi advising Gaozong to depose Wu was found in Zizhi Tongjian (vol.201) and Shangguan's biography in New Book of Tang. The Old Book of Tang recorded that Shangguan incurred the jealousy of court officials due to his arrogance; when Li Zhong was accused of treason, Xu Jingzong took the opportunity to frame Shangguan.) As Shangguan had served on the staff of Emperor Gaozong's first crown prince Li Zhong (who was not born of Empress Wu and who was displaced by Empress Wu's son Li Hong in 656 while Li Zhong was the Prince of Chen, and later both Shangguan and Wang served on Li Zhong's staff while Li Zhong was crown prince, (Note: As Li Zhong was created the Prince of Chen in 646 and crown prince in 652, and then reduced to be the Prince of Liang in 656, Shangguan's service must have been between those years.)) Empress Wu had her ally Xu Jingzong accuse Shangguan, Wang, and Li Zhong of plotting to kill Emperor Gaozong. Around the new year 665, Shangguan and Wang were both arrested and executed. Also killed was Shangguan's son Shangguan Tingzhi (上官庭芝). Li Zhong was thereafter forced to commit suicide. From then on, whenever Emperor Gaozong presided over imperial meetings and makes all the day-to-day decisions of the empire, Empress Wu would sit behind a pearl screen behind him to hear the all movements and reports and see and the real power of the state was fully and directly in the imperial meetings of that on Empress Wu. By order of Empress Wu Shangguan's assets were seized, and his family were taken as servants. A number of officials close to Shangguan, including fellow chancellor Liu Xiangdao, were demoted.

Shangguan Tingzhi's daughter Shangguan Wan'er, who was also literarily talented, became a palace servant. Empress Wu favored her talent and made her a secretary. After Empress Wu had seized the throne herself but then was overthrown by her son Emperor Zhongzong in 705, Emperor Zhongzong took Shangguan Wan'er as a concubine. She became powerful, as Emperor Zhongzong often had her draft his edicts. For this reason, Emperor Zhongzong posthumously awarded both Shangguan Yi and Shangguan Tingzhi a number of honors and reburied them with honor.
