= Aiiso Yufeng Li =

Nanoengineer and philanthropist

Aiiso Yufeng "Jeff" Li
- 李雨峰
- Pronunciation: /aɪˈiːsoʊ/
- Born: China
- Education: Hebei Normal University
- Occupations: Nanoengineer and Philanthropist
- Known for: Founder and CSO of CorDx Union.
- Spouse: DongDong “Doreen” Li

Aiiso Yufeng "Jeff" Li (English pronunciation: /aɪˈiːsoʊ/) is an Asian American nanoengineer, businessman, and philanthropist known as the founder and Chief Strategy Officer of CorDx Union. Born and educated in China, he moved to the United States, where he founded and registered CorDx in 2006 in California and Georgia. He is now based in the San Diego, California area.

== Early life and education ==
Li was born in China and graduated from Hebei Normal University in 2003, where he earned a Bachelor of Science degree in Biology.

== Career ==
Li has years of experience in the biotech industry, with expertise in business development, R&D, manufacturing, and healthcare. In 2006, he founded Cordx Union, a global biotech organization that focuses on pushing the limits of health care innovation. He thereafter became the Chief Science Officer (CSO) of the organisation.

In 2024, Li became an advisor to UC San Diego Jacobs School of Engineering. He is also a Board of Trustees of UC San Diego.

== Philanthropy and recognition ==
- In February 2024, Li and his wife, Dongdong Guo (Doreen Li) through their company CorDx, presented a $3 million gift to support educational research and collaborations in the UC San Diego Jacobs School of Engineering’s Sustainable Power and Energy Center (SPEC).
- Also in February 2024, Li, and his family also presented a $2.1 million gift to the UC San Diego Jacobs School of Engineering in support of research, education and student activities in the Department of NanoEngineering at the school.
- In May 2024, Li and his wife, Dongdong Guo (Doreen Li) presented a $21 million gift in support of the University of California, San Diego (UC San Diego) to encourage its efforts in strengthening the combination of chemical and nanoengineering. In recognition of this gift, the Department of Chemical and Nano Engineering at UC San Diego was named the Aiiso Yufeng Li Family Department of Chemical and Nano Engineering.

== Personal life ==
Li is married to DongDong “Doreen” Li and is based in the San Diego, California area.
