= Lady Helan =

- Lady of Wei

Succeeded by Lady Chen
- Reign: 7th century to 666
- Died: 666
Names
- Family name: Helan
- Father: Helan Yueshi
- Mother: Wu Shun

Lady Helan (Chinese: 賀蘭氏, 7th century – 666 CE) was the Lady of Wei (魏國夫人) during the Tang dynasty and the niece of Wu Zetian. The Lady of Wei was an honorific for relatives of the Emperor and Empress. She was involved in court politics during her lifetime. She was killed by being poisoned at a dinner party.

== Background ==
Lady Helan was the daughter of Wu Shun and Helan Yueshi (贺兰越石), Wu Shun was the first daughter of Wu Shiyue and Lady Yang, and the older sister of Empress Wu. Helan Yueshi was the son of the Duke of Yingshan (應山公) and died early.

== Lady of Wei ==
Lady Helan and her mother, Wu Shun, were favored by Emperor Gaozong who gave her the title Lady of Wei and her mother that of Lady of Han.

Emperor Gaozong wanted to keep Lady Helan as a concubine, but Empress Wu found out and had the Lady of Wei killed by poisoning. She then blamed Wu Weiliang and Wu Huaiyun for the murder and they were executed. Empress Wu accused Lady Helan's brother, Helan Minzhi (643 - 14 September 671), of suspecting her to be behind the murder of his sister. Helan Minzhi was exiled and later died in exile.

== Modern Depictions ==
Lady Helan is often known in television series as Helan Minyue (賀蘭敏月). She is often portrayed as an antagonist.

Drama	Portrayed	Notes & Sources
Palace of Desire	He Lin	Chinese television series based on the life of Princess Taiping.
Secret History of Empress Wu	Kathy Yuen	Chinese television series based on the life of Wu Zetian
The Empress of China	Sandra Ma	Chinese television series based on the life of Wu Zetian
