= Li Zhong =

Li Zhong 李忠
- Prince of Yan (posthumously)

Prince of Liang
- Reign: 656–660

Crown Prince of the Tang dynasty
- Reign: 652–656
- Predecessor: Li Zhi
- Successor: Li Hong

Prince of Chen
- Reign: 646–652
- Born: 643
- Died: 6 January 665 (aged 22)
- Father: Emperor Gaozong of Tang
- Mother: Consort Liu

Li Zhong (643 – 6 January 665), courtesy name Zhengben (正本), formally Prince of Yan (燕王), previously Prince of Chen (陳王) and Prince of Liang (梁王), was a prince of the Tang dynasty of China. He was the eldest son of Emperor Gaozong and was created crown prince in 652 even though he was not the son of his then-wife Empress Wang. After Empress Wang was displaced by Empress Wu (popularly known as Wu Zetian) in 655, Li Zhong was caught in Empress Wu's crosshairs and was forced to yield the crown prince position to his younger brother Li Hong, born to Empress Wu, in 656. He was later further reduced to commoner rank and put under house arrest, and when the chancellor Shangguan Yi failed in his attempt to persuade Emperor Gaozong to depose Empress Wu in 664 and was executed, Empress Wu took the opportunity to accuse Li Zhong of being complicit in Shangguan's plans. Around the new year 665, Emperor Gaozong at the urgent request of Empress Wu ordered Li Zhong to commit suicide. He was posthumously honored as an imperial prince, but not as crown prince, during the second reign of his younger brother Emperor Zhongzong.

== Background ==
Li Zhong was born in 643, shortly after his father Li Zhi became crown prince under his grandfather Emperor Taizong. His mother was Consort Liu, who was of lowly birth. He was Li Zhi's oldest son, and Li Zhi convened a feast with his staff at Hongjiao Hall (弘教殿) to celebrate. Emperor Taizong personally attended as well and danced to celebrate the grandson's birth. In 646, Emperor Taizong created Li Zhong the Prince of Chen. After Emperor Taizong's death in 649, Li Zhi succeeded him (as Emperor Gaozong), and he made Li Zhong titular prefect of the capital prefecture, Yong Prefecture (雍州, roughly modern Xi'an, Shaanxi).

== As crown prince ==
Emperor Gaozong's wife and empress Empress Wang did not have a son, and her uncle, the chancellor Liu Shi suggested to her to have Li Zhong made crown prince, hoping that he would be grateful to her. Empress Wang agreed, and Liu Shi subsequently lobbied the other chancellors, including Emperor Gaozong's powerful uncle Zhangsun Wuji, into agreeing to and requesting the same. Emperor Gaozong agreed, and in 652, he created Li Zhong crown prince. The chancellors Yu Zhining, Zhang Xingcheng, and Gao Jifu took on additional titles as the young crown prince's advisors.

In 655, Empress Wang, due to false accusations of murder and witchcraft by Emperor Gaozong's concubine Consort Wu (later known as Wu Zetian), was deposed, and Consort Wu was created empress to replace her. Empress Wu had two sons of her own by this point, and the oldest, Li Hong, was three years old. Empress Wu's ally, the official Xu Jingzong, submitted a petition arguing that it should be the empress' son who is made crown prince. Emperor Gaozong agreed, and in spring 656, Li Zhong was deposed and reduced to the title of Prince of Liang. He was further removed from the capital, to serve as the prefect of Liang Prefecture (梁州, roughly modern Hanzhong, Shaanxi). Li Hong was created crown prince in his stead.

== After removal ==
Later in 656, Li Zhong was moved from Liang Prefecture to Fang Prefecture (房州, roughly modern Shiyan, Hubei). As he grew in age, he began fearful that he would be a target of Empress Wu, and he sometimes wore women's clothes to try to evade assassins and engaged fortunetellers to try to see his future. These acts were reported to Emperor Gaozong, and in 660, Emperor Gaozong reduced him to commoner rank and put under house arrest in Qian Prefecture (黔州, modern southeastern Chongqing), held at the same house that his uncle Li Chengqian, who had been crown prince before Emperor Gaozong, had been held after his removal in 643.

In 664, after the chancellor Shangguan Yi made an unsuccessful attempt to have Emperor Gaozong agree to have Empress Wu removed on account of her misbehavior, Empress Wu had Xu Jingzong accuse Shangguan Yi and the eunuch Wang Fusheng (王伏勝, who had reported Empress Wu's misbehavior to Emperor Gaozong), both of whom had previously served on Li Zhong's staff, of conspiring with Li Zhong to commit treason. On January 4, 665, Shangguan and Wang, as well as Shangguan's son Shangguan Tingzhi (上官庭芝) were executed, and two days later, on January 6, Emperor Gaozong ordered Li Zhong to commit suicide. Later in 665, at Li Hong's request, Li Zhong was given a proper burial. After the death of Li Zhong, Empress Wu formally took over the government. Decades later, after Empress Wu's death in 705, her son Emperor Zhongzong posthumously honored Li Zhong as the Prince of Yan, but not crown prince.

== Titles ==
- 646–652: His Imperial Highness The Prince of Chen
- 652–656: His Imperial Highness The Crown Prince
- 656–660: His Imperial Highness The Prince of Liang
- 660–664: Commoner
- Posthumous titles: His Imperial Highness The Prince of Yan

== Notes and references ==
- Old Book of Tang, vol. 86.
- New Book of Tang, vol. 81.
- Zizhi Tongjian, vols. 199, 200, 201.
