= Yang Shidao =

Yang Shidao 楊師道
- Born: Unknown
- Died: 647
- Other names: Jingyou (景猷); Duke Yi of Ande (安德懿公)
- Occupation: Politician
- Spouse: Princess Guiyang
- Children: Yang Yuzhi; one daughter
- Father: Yang Xiong
- Relatives: Yang Gongren (brother)

Yang Shidao (died 647), courtesy name Jingyou, posthumously known as Duke Yi of Ande, was a Chinese politician who served as a chancellor during the reign of Emperor Taizong in the Tang dynasty.

== Background ==
It is not known when Yang Shidao was born. He was a son of Yang Xiong (楊雄), a distant nephew of the Sui dynasty and one of the four most powerful officials at one point early in Sui, with Gao Jiong, Yu Qingze (虞慶則), and Su Wei and who was created an imperial prince with various titles, eventually the title of Prince of Guan. His older brother Yang Gongren served as an official during both the Sui and Tang dynasty and who briefly served as chancellor during the reign of Tang's founder Emperor Gaozu.

== During Emperor Gaozu's reign ==
At the end of the Sui dynasty, when the state was engulfed in uprisings against Emperor Wen's son Emperor Yang, Yang Shidao was at the eastern capital Luoyang, and was subsequently detained by the general Wang Shichong, who deposed Sui's final emperor Yang Tong (Emperor Yang's grandson) in 619 and established a new state of Zheng as its emperor, but Yang Shidao was eventually able to go to Chang'an, where another general, Li Yuan had established the Tang dynasty as its Emperor Gaozu in 618. (It is not completely clear whether Yang's travel to Chang'an was before or after Zheng's fall to Tang in 621, but likely before.) Late in 621, when Eastern Tujue forces attacked Ling Prefecture (靈州, roughly modern Yinchuan, Ningxia), Yang Shidao was referred to as the commandant at Ling Prefecture, and he was able to repel the Eastern Tujue attack; he would again be involved in a campaign resisting Eastern Tujue attacks in 622. Yang Shidao's older brother Yang Gongren was an old friend of Emperor Gaozu's, and, at some point, Yang Shidao was made a guard commander for Emperor Gaozu's guards. Emperor Gaozu gave Yang Shidao his daughter Princess Guiyang in marriage. Yang Shidao later served as the deputy minister of civil service affairs, and then the minister of rites. He was also created the Duke of Ande—a title that his father had held at one point. In 624, when the crown prince Li Jiancheng's guard commander Yang Wen'gan (楊文幹) rebelled, Yang Shidao was one of the generals whose forces were involved in defeating Yang Wen'gan.

== During Emperor Taizong's reign ==
In 636, after Emperor Gaozu had succeeded by his son Li Shimin in 626 (after Li Shimin ambushed and killed Li Jiancheng and another brother Li Yuanji and then effectively forced Emperor Gaozu to yield the throne to him), Yang Shidao was made Palace Attendant, the head of the Chancellery and a position automatically entitled to chancellor status. He was considered careful in his actions, not leaking any words on the important matters of state. He once said, "When I was young, I read the Book of Han, and I saw that Kong Guang [(孔光, a prime minister during the reigns of Emperor Cheng of Han and Emperor Ai of Han)] was not even willing to speak about the trees in the greenhouses inside the palace. I admired that, and I want to be like that." Whenever he left imperial gatherings, he would invite talented people to meet at his mansion to discuss literature, and the gatherings at his house were considered important literary events. He was also said to be talented at calligraphy. In 639, he became Zhongshu ling (中書令), the head of the Legislative Bureau and likewise a default chancellor.

In 643, a plot centering the crown prince Li Chengqian was discovered where Li Chengqian considered overthrowing his father. Yang's stepson Zhao Jie (趙節), a son of Princess Guiyang (now titled Princess Changguang) by her deceased husband Zhao Cijing (趙慈景)) was one of the co-conspirators. When Yang was involved in the investigation of the case, he tried to intercede on Zhao Jie's behalf with Emperor Taizong, and this displeased Emperor Taizong. Yang was therefore demoted to the post of minister of civil service affairs, no longer a chancellor. Zhao Jie was executed. (Emperor Taizong later personally visited Princess Changguang to apologize for the fact that he could not spare Zhao Jie, but stated that he did so because he had to be fair in governing the state.) Because Yang was born out of a very honored lineage, he was well-acquainted with the nobles. However, because of this, he did not promote people that he knew well to avoid appearance of conflict of interest. This, in turn, however, brought criticism that he was not in fact being fair, as he was not promoting that he knew to be capable. In 644, when Emperor Taizong, at an imperial gathering, stated to his key officials their strengths and weaknesses, he spoke, with regard to Yang:

Yang Shidao is pure and mild in his actions, and he will not make mistakes or offenses. But because he is weak and timid in personality, I cannot receive his help in times of urgency.

In 645, when Emperor Taizong attacked Goguryeo, Yang followed him and was made acting Zhongshu Ling, but was said to perform poorly, and after the end of the campaign, he was demoted to the post of minister of labor, and then minister of rites. He died in 647 and was buried near the tomb of Emperor Taizong's wife Empress Zhangsun, where Emperor Taizong would eventually be buried himself.
