= Victor Li (engineer) =

Victor C. Li
- Known for: Engineered cementitious composite

Academic background
- Education: Brown University (B.Sc., M.Sc., Ph.D.)

Academic work
- Institutions: University of Michigan

Victor C. Li is the James R. Rice Distinguished University Professor of Engineering and the E.B. Wylie Collegiate Professor of Civil Engineering at the University of Michigan. He is also Director of the Center for Low Carbon Built Environment at the University of Michigan College of Engineering. Li led the team that developed engineered cementitious composites (EEC), popularly known as "bendable concrete." Li argues EEC can increase the durability of infrastructure and reduce its carbon footprint.

== Education ==
Li grew up in Hong Kong; he moved to the U.S. in 1973 to attend Brown University in Providence, Rhode Island. He graduated with an undergraduate degree in economics and engineering from Brown in 1977. Li remained at the Brown University School of Engineering for graduate studies, earning an M.Sc. in mechanical engineering in 1978 and a Ph.D. in solid and structural mechanics in 1981. At Brown, Li was mentored by James R. Rice and Lambert Ben Freund.

== Career ==
Li taught at the Massachusetts Institute of Technology from 1981 to 1989 as an assistant and later associate professor. He joined the University of Michigan in 1990 as an associate professor, becoming a full professor in 1993. Between 1999 and 2004, Li was the Højgaard Visiting Professor of Concrete Technology at the Technical University of Denmark in Kongens Lyngby, Denmark.

In 2005, Li and his team of researchers gained attention for developing a new type of fiber-reinforced bendable concrete. In 2019, Li published Engineered Cementitious Composites (ECC): Bendable Concrete for Sustainable and Resilient Infrastructure, the first book devoted to the subject of ECCs.

In 2004, Li was awarded a doctorate honoris causa from the Technical University of Denmark.
