= Wu Shun =

Sister of Wu Zetian

Wu Shun (武顺), courtesy name Mouze (某则), (623-665) was the Lady of Han during the Tang dynasty and the older sister of Wu Zetian. The Lady of Han was an honorable title for relatives of the Emperor and Empress.

Wu Shun was allegedly the mother of Li Xian, the crown prince, and the rumors eventually led to his demise. In all likelihood, her sister Empress Wu, who had become a full-fledged power behind the throne after January 665, ordered her poisoning.

== Background ==
Wu Shun was the daughter of Wu Shiyue and Lady Yang. Wu Shiyue was an army commander of Yingyang Prefecture during the reign of Emperor Yang of Sui and Minister of Revenue during the reign of Taizong of Tang. Lady Yang was from the noble Yang family of the Hongnong region. Wu Shun had two half-brothers from Wu Shiyue's previous marriage and two sisters: Wu Zhao and the Lady of Guo.

She married a Xianbei man named Helan Yueshi (贺兰越石), the son of the Duke of Yingshan. They had two children; a son named Helan Minzhi (643 - 14 September 671) and a daughter, Lady Helan. Wu Shun's husband had died early, leaving her a widow. Since her younger sister was made empress consort to Emperor Gaozong, she was able to visit the palace frequently, and she eventually became the emperor's mistress. Her daughter, whose beauty surpassed even her mother's, also attracted the emperor's favor. Emperor Gaozong eventually created her the Lady of Han title and wanted to let her live in the palace.

== Lady of Han ==
On 29 January 655, Wu Shun's sister, Consort Wu gave birth to Li Xian. Li Xian was Emperor Gaozong's sixth son. After an intense power struggle involving Consort Wu, Empress Wang and Consort Xiao, Consort Wu became Empress. Li Xian was created the Prince of Lu. However, there were rumors inside the palace that the Crown Prince was not actually born of Consort Wu but of Wu Shun, Lady of Han.

After the crown prince Li Hong died, Li Xian was created the crown prince. Although he was praised for making good decisions regarding the government, he had a poor relationship with his mother after hearing the rumors that he was actually the son of Lady of Han. When Empress Wu's most trusted sorcerer Ming Chongyan was assassinated, Empress Wu suspected Li Xian. Eventually, one of Li Xian's favorite servants, Zhao Daosheng, admitted to assassinating Ming on Li Xian's orders and Emperor Gaozong deposed Li Xian and reduced him to commoner status. After Emperor Gaozong's death, Li Xian's brother Li Zhe (Emperor Zhongzong) ascended to the throne as Emperor and Empress Wu became Empress Dowager. Empress Dowager Wu retained all powers, dominance and influence as regent and after the disobedience of Emperor Zhongzong, she quickly deposed him and replaced him with his younger brother Li Dan (Emperor Ruizong), after which she held the throne more firmly in her hands. Then, she sent the general Qiu Shenji to Ba Prefecture with the order of killing the former crown prince. Qiu Shenji placed Li Xian into a small room and forced him to commit suicide.

Wu Shun's children would also be implicated in court conflicts. Her daughter Lady Helan was loved by Emperor Gaozong and he created her the Lady of Wei. He wanted to keep her as a concubine, but Empress Wu found out and was angered. Empress Wu had the Lady of Wei poisoned by placing poison in food offerings that her cousins had made. She then proceeded to blame Wu Weiliang and Wu Huaiyun for the murder and they were executed. Wu Shun's son, Helan Minzhi, suspected Empress Wu of murdering his sister. He disobeyed mourning regulations during the period of mourning for Lady Yang and was exiled. He was presumed to be executed in exile or committed suicide.

Wu Shun died in 665 and was honored as the Lady of Zheng. She was suspected to have been poisoned by Wu Zetian after committing adultery with Emperor Gaozong. After Empress Wu established the Zhou dynasty, Wu Shun was posthumously honored as the Elder Princess.
