= Guofang Li =

Guofang Li is a professor of education at the University of British Columbia (UBC) in Vancouver, British Columbia, Canada. She holds the Canada Research Chair in Transnational/Global Perspectives of Language and Literacy Education of Children. Li is the author of over 100 journal articles and over a dozen books on topics related to literacy, teaching, and diversity and equity issues.

== Early life and education ==
Li was born and raised in rural China. She completed an undergraduate degree at Hubei University and a M.A. degree in applied linguistics at Wuhan University. She earned a PhD in curriculum studies from the University of Saskatchewan in 2000.

== Career ==
Li was an assistant professor at Buffalo State College, a State University of New York campus, from 2001 through 2006. She joined the faculty in the Department of Teacher Education at Michigan State University in 2006. In 2016, she was announced as a new Canada Research Chair in Transnational/Global Perspectives of Language and Literacy Education of Children at the UBC's Faculty of Education.

== Selected works ==
=== Books ===
Zhao, Y., Lei, J., Li, G., He, M. F., Okano, K., Megahed, N., Gamage, D., & Ramanathan N. (Eds., 2011). Handbook of Asian education: A cultural approach. New York: Routledge.

Li, G. (Ed. 2009). Multicultural families, home literacies, and mainstream schooling. Greenwich, CT: Information Age Publishing.

Li, G., & Wang, L. (Eds., 2008). Model minority myths revisited: An interdisciplinary approach to demystifying Asian American education experiences. Greenwich, CT: Information Age Publishing.

Li, G. (2008). Culturally contested literacies: America’s “rainbow underclass” and urban schools. New York: Routledge.

Li, G. (2006). Culturally contested pedagogy: Battles of literacy and schooling between mainstream teachers and Asian immigrant parents. Albany, NY: SUNY Press.

Li, G., & Beckett, G. (Eds.) (2006). “Strangers” of the academy: Asian women scholars in higher education. Sterling, VA: Stylus Publishing.

=== Articles ===
Li, G. (2019). Resource diversity in Asian immigrants and refugees: Implications for language arts instruction. Language Arts, 96(6), 370–383.

Li, G., & Wen, K. (2015). East Asian heritage language education in the United States: Practices, potholes, and possibilities. International Multilingual Research Journal, 9(4), 274–290.

Li, G. (2013). Promoting teachers of culturally and linguistically diverse (CLD) students as change agents: A cultural approach to professional learning. Theory Into Practice, 52(2), 136–143.

Li, G. (2010). Race, class, and schooling: Multicultural families doing the hard work of home literacy in America's inner city. Reading & Writing Quarterly, 26(2), 140–165.

Li, G. (2007). Second language and literacy learning in school and at home: An ethnographic study of Chinese-Canadian first graders’ experiences. Journal of Literacy Teaching and Learning, 11(1), 1-40.
