= Song Li (bioengineer) =

Chinese-American bioengineer

Song Li (Chinese: 李松; pinyin: Lǐ Sōng) is a chancellor professor and former Department Chair of Bioengineering at University of California, Los Angeles. He received his Ph.D. in bioengineering from University of California, San Diego. Dr. Li was a Bioengineering faculty at University of California, Berkeley (2001-2015), and he moved to UCLA in 2016. His research is focused on cell engineering, mechanobiology, biomaterials, and regenerative medicine. He is well recognized bioengineer, and has been elected as a Fellow of the International Academy of Medical and Biological Engineering, Biomedical Engineering Society and American Institute for Medical and Biological Engineering.

== Education ==
Li received his Bachelor of Science in mechanics and engineering science and also his Master of Science in biomechanics from Peking University. He received his Ph.D. from University of California, San Diego, working with Professor Shu Chien.

== Selected recent publications ==
• Yang Song, Jennifer Soto, Binru Chen, Tyler Hoffman, Weikang Zhao, Ninghao Zhu, Qin Peng, Longwei Liu, Chau Ly, Pak Kin Wong, Yingxiao Wang, Amy C Rowat, Siavash K Kurdistani, Song Li. Transient nuclear deformation primes epigenetic state and promotes cell reprogramming. Nature Materials, 1-9

• J Zarubova, MM Hasani-Sadrabadi, R Ardehali, S Li. Immunoengineering strategies to enhance vascularization and tissue regeneration. Advanced Drug Delivery Reviews, 114233

• Xuexiang Zhang, Mohammad Mahdi Hasani-Sadrabadi, Jana Zarubova, Erfan Dashtimighadam, Reihaneh Haghniaz, Ali Khademhosseini, Manish J Butte, Alireza Moshaverinia, Tara Aghaloo, Song Li. Immunomodulatory microneedle patch for periodontal tissue regeneration. Matter 5 (2), 666-682

• Y Zhou, X Zhao, J Xu, Y Fang, G Chen, Y Song, S Li, J Chen. Giant magnetoelastic effect in soft systems for bioelectronics. Nature Materials 20 (12), 1670-1676

• X Zhao, Y Zhou, J Xu, G Chen, Y Fang, T Tat, X Xiao, Y Song, S Li, J Chen. Soft fibers with magnetoelasticity for wearable electronics. Nature communications 12 (1), 1-11

• Zhaowei Chen, Hongjun Li, Yijie Bian, Zejun Wang, Guojun Chen, Xudong Zhang, Yimin Miao, Di Wen, Jinqiang Wang, Gang Wan, Yi Zeng, Peter Abdou, Jun Fang, Song Li, Cheng-Jun Sun, Zhen Gu. Bioorthogonal catalytic patch. Nature Nanotechnology 16 (8), 933-941

• Fang J, Sia J, Soto J, Wang P, Li L, Hsueh Y, Sun R, Faull K, Tidball J, Li S. Skeletal muscle regeneration via the chemical induction and expansion of myogenic stem cells in situ or in vitro. Nat Biomed Eng. March 2021. https://doi.org/10.1038/s41551-021-00696-y

• Song Y, Soto J, Wang P, An Q, Zhang X, Hong S, Lee LP, Fan G, Yang L, Li S. Asymmetric cell division of fibroblasts is an early deterministic step to generate elite cells during cell reprogramming. Advanced Science. 2021 Feb; 2003516.

• Zarubova J, Zhang X, Hoffman T, Hasani-Sadrabadi MM, Li S. Biomaterial-based Immunoengineering to Fight COVID-19 and Infectious Diseases. Matter. 2021 4(5): 1528-1554

• Qiu X, Lee BL, Wong SY, Ding X, Xu K, Zhao W, Wang D, Sochol R, Dong N, Li S. Cellular remodeling of fibrotic conduit as vascular graft. Biomaterials. 2021 Jan; 268:120565.

• Choi YS, Hsueh YY, Koo J, Yang Q, Avila R, Hu B, Xie Z, Lee G, Ning Z, Liu C, Xu Y, Lee YJ, Zhao W, Fang J, Deng Y, Lee SM, Vázquez-Guardado A, Stepien I, Yan Y, Song JW, Haney C, Oh YS, Liu W, Yun HJ, Banks A, MacEwan MR, Ameer GA, Ray WZ, Huang Y, Xie T, Franz CK, Li S*, Rogers JA*. Stretchable, dynamic covalent polymers for soft, long-lived bioresorbable electronic stimulators designed to facilitate neuromuscular regeneration. Nature Communications. 2020; 11:5990.

• Hasani-Sadrabadi MM, Sarrion P, Pouraghaei S, Chau Y, Ansari S, Li S, Aghaloo T, Moshaverinia A. An engineered cell-laden adhesive hydrogel promotes craniofacial bone tissue regeneration in rats. Sci Transl Med. 2020 Mar 11;12(534).

• Fang J, Koh J, Fang Q, Qiu H, Archang MM, Hasani-Sadrabadi MM, Miwa H, Zhong X, Sievers R, Gao D, Lee R, Di Carlo D, Li S. Injectable Drug‐Releasing Microporous Annealed Particle Scaffolds for Treating Myocardial Infarction. Adv Func Mater. 2020; 30(43):2004307.

• Hasani-Sadrabadi MM, Majedi FS, Miller M, Thauland TJ, Bouchard LS, Li S*, Butte MJ* Augmenting T-cell responses to tumors by in situ nanomanufacturing. Materials Horizons. 2020; 7:3028-3033.

• Zhang X, Kim T, Thauland TJ, Li H, Majedi FS, Ly C, Gu Z, Butte MJ, Rowat AC, Li S. Unraveling the mechanobiology of immune cells. Current Opinion in Biotechnology. 2020; 66:236-245.

• Song Y, Soto J, Chen B, Yang L, Li S. Cell engineering: Biophysical regulation of the nucleus. Biomaterials. 2020 Mar; 234:119743.

• Fang J, Hsueh YY, Soto J, Sun W, Wang J, Gu Z, Khademhosseini A, Li S. Engineering Biomaterials with Micro/Nanotechnologies for Cell Reprogramming. ACS Nano. 2020 Feb 25; 14(2):1296-1318.

• Downing T, Soto J, Morez C, Houssin T, Yuan F, Chu J, Fritz A, Patel S, Schaffer D, Li S Biophysical regulation of epigenetic state and cell reprogramming. Nature Materials. 2013; 12:1154-1162.

• Yu J, Wang A, Tang Z, Henry J, Li-Ping Lee B, Zhu Y, Yuan F, Huang F, Li S. The effect of stromal cell-derived factor-1α/heparin coating of biodegradable vascular grafts on the recruitment of both endothelial and smooth muscle progenitor cells for accelerated regeneration. Biomaterials. 2012; 33(32):8062-8074.

• Tang, Z, Wang, A, Yuan, F, Yan, Z, Liu, B, Chu, JS, Helms JA, Li S. Differentiation of multipotent vascular stem cells contributes to vascular diseases. Nature Communications. 2012; 3:875.

• Wang A, Tang Z, Park IH, Zhu Y, Patel S, Daley GQ, Li S. Induced pluripotent stem cells for neural tissue engineering. Biomaterials. 2011; 32(55):5023-32.

• Park JS, Chu JS, Tsou AD, Diop R, Tang Z, Wang A, Li S. The effect of matrix stiffness on the differentiation of mesenchymal stem cells in response to TGF-β. Biomaterials. 2011; 32:3921-3930.
