= Li Han (aviator) =

Chinese Korean War flying ace

Li Han (Chinese: 李汉, 1924 in Tang County, Hebei – 11 September 1997) was a MiG-15 pilot of the People's Republic of China. He was a flying ace during the Korean War, with eight victories.

A member of the 4th Fighter Aviation Division He was the first Chinese pilot credited with shooting down a U.S. aircraft.

Although all Chinese aces have received the title Combat Hero in acknowledgement of their services, very little information is known of the Chinese pilots during the war due to the lack of published records.

== See also ==
- List of Korean War flying aces
