= Wu Shiyue =

Father of Wu Zetian

- Born: 559
- Died: 635 (aged 75–76)
- Spouse: Lady Xiangli; Lady Yang
- Issue: Wu Yuanqing, Prince Xian of Liang; Wu Yuanshuang, Prince De of Wei; Wu Zhiyuan, Prince Shu; Wu Shun, Lady of Han; Wu Zetian, Empress Tang and Zhou; Lady Wu, Lady of Guo
Posthumous name
- Ding 定 Emperor Wushang Xiaoming Gao 無上孝明高皇帝 (honored by Wu Zetian)
Temple name
- Taizu 太祖 (honored by Wu Zetian)
- Father: Wu Hua
- Mother: Lady Zhao

Wǔ Shìyuē (simplified Chinese: 武士彟; traditional Chinese: 武士彠; 559–635 CE) was the father of Wu Zetian, the only woman in the history of China to assume the title of Empress Regnant. He was posthumously honored the title of King Zhongxiao. Wu was the son of Wu Hua and became a timber merchant. He was also known as the Duke of Ying and King of Wei serving as army commander of Yingyang Prefecture during the final years of Emperor Yang of Sui (r. 605–618 CE) and subsequently as Minister of Revenue and superintendent of Jingzhou City, Hubei during the reign of Emperor Taizong of Tang (r. 627–649 CE).

Initially, Wu married a woman from the Xiangli family, who gave birth to two sons named Wu Yuanqing and Wu Yuanshuang. Later he remarried a woman from the noble Yang family of the Hongnong region. She was daughter, niece, and sister to several ministers and a close relation of the imperial family. By her, Wu had three daughters: Wu Shun (later the Lady of Han), Wu Zhao (Empress Wu Zetian) and the Lady of Guo.

After Wu died in 635 CE, his two sons were rude to their stepmother; after Wu Zetian came to power, she banished her half-brothers from the imperial court. At the same time she named Helan Minzhi, the son of her sister Wu Shun, as heir to her father. However, Wu Zetian became displeased with Helan Minzhi's conduct and sent him into exile where he died. Thereafter she recalled Wu Yuanshuang's son, Wu Chengsi, from exile and made him Wu Shiyue's successor.

Posthumously, Wu Shiyue received the titles of Emperor Zhongxiao of Zhou and Supreme Founding Emperor of the Southern Zhou Dynasty (690–705).

== Family ==
- Furen, of the Xiangli clan (相里夫人)
  - Wu Yuanqing, Prince Xian of Liang (武元庆梁宪王), first son
  - Wu Yuanshuang, Prince De of Wei (武元爽 魏德王), second son
- Empress Xiaominggao, of the Yang clan (孝明高皇后)
  - Wu Shun, Lady of Han (武顺 韓國夫人), first daughter
    - Married Helan Yueshi (賀蘭安石) and had issue (one son and one daughter Lady Helan)
  - Wu Zetian, Empress Tang and Zhou (武則天), second daughter
    - Married Li Shimin (李世民), the second son of Li Yuan (李淵)
    - Married Li Zhi (李治), the ninth son of Li Shimin (李世民), and had issue (four sons and two daughters)
  - Lady Wu, Lady of Guo (郭孝慎), third daughter
