= Li Sujie =

Chinese prince, son of Emperor Gaozong

Li Sujie (李素節) (646 CE – c.691 CE), formally the Prince of Xu (許王), was an imperial prince of the Chinese Tang dynasty. He was the fourth son of Emperor Gaozong, born of his one-time favorite Pure Consort Xiao. After Consort Xiao and Emperor Gaozong's wife Empress Wang were deposed and executed due to the machinations of Emperor Gaozong's second wife Empress Wu (posthumously known as Wu Zetian), Li Sujie was under the watchful eyes of Empress Wu, and was several times demoted on false accusations of misbehavior, In particular, as Emperor Gaozong's health deteriorated and government affairs fell to Empress Wu, Li's grief increased. During the Tianshou era, with Wu finally establishing her own dynasty, she continued to massacre Tang imperial clan members as she perceived them as threats, and she summoned Li Sujie and his older brother Li Shangjin (李上金) to the then-capital Luoyang. When they arrived near Luoyang, Empress Dowager Wu had him strangled, while Li Shangjin committed suicide.

== Before Consort Xiao's death ==
Li Sujie was born in 646, when his father Li Zhi was crown prince under his grandfather Emperor Taizong. He was Li Zhi's fourth son, and he was born of Li Zhi's then-favorite concubine, Consort Xiao. After Emperor Taizong's death in 649, Li Zhi succeeded him (as Emperor Gaozong), and in 651 created Li Sujie the Prince of Yong and gave him titularly the important post of prefect of the capital prefecture, Yong Prefecture (雍州, roughly modern Xi'an, Shaanxi). It was said that Li Sujie could recite 500-word ancient poems and was studious in studying under the scholar Xu Qidan (徐齊聃). He was said to be much loved by Emperor Gaozong. When he grew older, he was made the prefect of Qi Prefecture (岐州, roughly modern Baoji, Shaanxi).

Meanwhile, Li Sujie's mother Consort Xiao was locked in a fierce battle with Consort Wu (later known as Wu Zetian) for the affections of Emperor Gaozong, in which she allied herself with the emperor's primary wife Empress Wang. In 655, Consort Wu accused Empress Wang and her mother Lady Liu (sister of Liu Shi) of engaging in witchcraft; in response, Emperor Gaozong deposed and imprisoned not only Empress Wang, but also Consort Xiao, on 16 November, replacing Empress Wang with Consort Wu. Soon thereafter (within the same lunar month of their deposition), the deposed Empress Wang and Consort Xiao were executed on Empress Wu's orders.

== After Consort Xiao's death ==
After Consort Xiao's death, Li Sujie drew Empress Wu's suspicions because he was born of Consort Xiao. In 657, with the beginning of the elimination of the main political rivals by Empress Wu, Li Sujie's title was changed to the lesser title of Prince of Xun, and around the same time, he was demoted from Qian Prefecture to the less important Shen Prefecture (申州, roughly modern Xinyang, Henan). Early in Emperor Gaozong's Qianfeng era (666-668), by Empress Wu's influence and instigation, Emperor Gaozong further issued an edict that stated, "Because Sujie is chronically ill, he is not required to attend imperial gatherings at the capital," even though, in reality, Li Sujie was not ill, and effectively, the edict barred Li Sujie from the capital Chang'an. Saddened that he was not allowed to see his father, Li Sujie wrote an essay entitled, Commentary on Faithfulness and Filial Piety (忠孝論, which was already lost by the Five Dynasties period). His cashier Zhang Jianzhi secretly submitted the essay to Emperor Gaozong. After Empress Wu read it, it drew her ire, and she falsely accused Li Sujie of corruption. In 676, Li Sujie was demoted to the title of Prince of Poyang, exiled to Yuan Prefecture (袁州, roughly modern Yichun, Jiangxi), and put under house arrest.

In 681, Empress Wu submitted a petition for Li Sujie and his older brother Li Shangjin the Prince of Qi to be forgiven their crimes. (Li Shangjin had been previously accused of similar offenses as Li Sujie's and was similarly put under house arrest.) Emperor Gaozong made Li Sujie the prefect of Yue Prefecture (岳州, roughly modern Yueyang, Hunan), but still disallowed him and Li Shangjin to visit the capital.

== Death ==
On 27 December 683, Emperor Gaozong died and was succeeded by Empress Wu's third son Li Xiǎn (as Emperor Zhongzong), but Empress Wu took on actual regent powers as empress dowager. On 27 February 684, after Emperor Zhongzong showed signs of disobeying her, she deposed him and replaced him with her fourth son Li Dan (as Emperor Ruizong), but held even firmer grip on power thereafter. In spring 684, she created Li Sujie the greater title of Prince of Ge and soon thereafter changed his title to Prince of Xu, making him the prefect of Jiang Prefecture (絳州, part of modern Yuncheng, Shanxi).

During the Tianshou era, Empress Dowager Wu was carrying out massacres of Tang imperial clan members and others whom she perceived to be threats, using a number of secret police officers to carry out tortures and executions. Her powerful nephew Wu Chengsi instructed one of the secret police officers, Zhou Xing (周興), to falsely accuse Li Sujie and Li Shangjin of treason. She ordered them to report to Luoyang, which she had made capital. Li Sujie was heading to Luoyang from his then-post Shu Prefecture (舒州, roughly modern Anqing, Anhui), when he heard family members mourning a person's death crying bitterly, and he made the comment, "Dying of illness is fortunate and difficult to get. Why do they cry?" As he was in Luoyang's vicinity, Empress Dowager Wu ordered that he be strangled. (Li Shangjin committed suicide.) Empress Dowager Wu also killed nine of Li Sujie's sons (Li Jing, Li Ying, Li Qi, Li Wan, Li Zan, Li Yang, Li Yuan, Li Chen and Li Tangchen), but four youngest sons were spared and imprisoned at Lei Prefecture (雷州, roughly modern Zhanjiang, Guangdong). After her death in 705, Emperor Zhongzong was restored to the throne, and Li Sujie was posthumously honored the Prince of Xu and reburied with honor near Emperor Gaozong's (and Empress Wu's) tomb. His son Li Guan (李瓘) was created the Prince of Xu to succeed him, and later, during the reign of Li Sujie's nephew Emperor Xuanzong, two other sons, Li Lin (李琳) and Li Qiu (李璆) were created princes as well.

== Ancestry ==
16. Li Bing, Duke Ren of Tang
8. Emperor Gaozu
17. Duchess Dugu
4. Emperor Taizong
18. Dou Yi, Duke of Shenwu
9. Empress Taimushunsheng
19. Princess Xiangyang of Northern Zhou
2. Emperor Gaozong
20. Zhangsun Si
10. Zhangsun Sheng
5. Empress Wendeshunsheng
22. Gao Jingde or Gao Mai
11. Lady Gao
1. Li Sujie
3. Consort Xiao
