= Yang Gongren =

Yang Gongren 楊恭仁
- Born: Unknown
- Died: 639
- Other names: Yang Guan (楊綸); Duke Xiao of Guan (觀孝公)
- Occupations: Military general, politician
- Children: Yang Siyi; Yang Sixun; Yang Sina
- Father: Yang Xiong
- Relatives: Yang Shidao (brother)

Yang Guan (died 639), courtesy name Gongren, better known as Yang Gongren, formally Duke Xiao of Guan, was a Chinese military general and politician during the Sui and Tang dynasties, at one point serving as a Tang chancellor.

== Background ==
It is unknown when Yang Gongren was born. He was the oldest son of Yang Xiong (楊雄), a distant nephew of the Sui dynasty's founder Emperor Wen, who was considered one of the four most powerful officials during the early Sui dynasty, with Gao Jiong, Yu Qingze (虞慶則), and Su Wei and who was created an imperial prince with various titles, eventually the title of Prince of Guan.

== During the Sui dynasty ==
Late in the reign of Emperor Wen (some time between 601 and 604), Yang Gongren became the governor of Gan Province (甘州, roughly modern Zhangye, Gansu). It was said that he had a good grasp on general governance and intentionally refused to dwell on details, and that in doing so comforted the non-Han residents of the province. It was said that Emperor Wen told his father Yang Xiong, "Gongren governs the province well. It is not only that I selected the right person, but because you have taught him in the ways of righteousness."

Early in the reign of Emperor Wen's son Emperor Yang, Yang Gongren was the assistant minister of civil service matters. When the general Yang Xuangan rebelled in 613, Yang Gongren was one of the generals Emperor Yang sent against Yang Xuangan, and he participated in destroying Yang Xuangan. He received great praise from both Emperor Yang and Su Wei.

However, it was said at the time that the matters of civil service were being controlled by Su, Yuwen Shu, Pei Yun (裴蘊), and Pei Ju, and that they were largely corrupt. Yang Gongren was considered honest and was not tolerated by Pei Yun, and therefore was instead commissioned to lead the army against agrarian rebels in the modern Hunan region. He was, however, defeated by the rebel general Zhu Can at Qiao Commandery (譙郡, roughly modern Bozhou, Anhui), and forced to flee to Emperor Yang's then-location at Jiangdu (江都, in modern Yangzhou, Jiangsu).

In spring 618, the general Yuwen Huaji killed Emperor Yang in a coup and declared Emperor Yang's nephew Yang Hao the Prince of Qin emperor. While he killed a large number of high level officials and imperial Yang clan members, he did not kill Yang Gongren and made Yang Gongren the minister of civil service matters. After Yuwen advanced north of the elite Xiaoguo Army (驍果) but was defeated by Li Mi, he headed further north, and he left Yang Gongren defending Wei (魏縣, in modern Handan, Hebei). In 619, the Tang official Wei Zheng, however, persuaded another official Yuwen left at Wei, Yuan Baozang (元寶藏), to seize Yang Gongren and submit to Emperor Gaozu of Tang. Yuan delivered Yang Gongren to the Tang capital Chang'an. As Emperor Gaozu, while a Sui official, was a friend of Yang Gongren's, he released Yang Gongren and made him the assistant head of the examination bureau of the government (門下省, Mengxia Sheng) and created him the Duke of Guan.

== During Emperor Gaozu's reign ==
Emperor Gaozu soon made Yang Gongren the commandant at Liang Prefecture (涼州, roughly modern Wuwei, Gansu), because of his familiarity with the region. Yang was able to govern effectively, and it was said that tribes east of the Pamir Mountains were all nominally submitting to Tang as a result. At times, when Eastern Tujue forces attacked, he was able to repel them, but his own territory nevertheless suffered losses from Eastern Tujue raids. In winter 619, Yang was nominally given the title of Nayan (納言) -- the title for the head of the examination bureau, one considered as a post for a chancellor, but it was also explicitly stated that he did not actually take on the responsibilities of Nayan, but remained at Liang Prefecture.

In 623, Emperor Gaozu recalled Yang to Chang'an to be Zhongshu Ling (中書令), the head of the legislative bureau of government, considered to be a chancellor post as well. He also was made the minister of civil service affairs. He also continued to nominally serve as the commandant at Liang Prefecture.

In 626, Emperor Gaozu's son Li Shimin the Prince of Qin, in an intense rivalry with his brother Li Jiancheng the Crown Prince, ambushed Li Jiancheng and another brother, Li Yuanji the Prince of Qi (who supported Li Jiancheng) at Xuanwu Gate and killed them, and then effectively forced Emperor Gaozu to create him crown prince. He also took effective rein of the government and reorganized it. As part of the reorganization, Yang was removed from his posts, but remained a general.

== During Emperor Taizong's reign ==
Two months later, Emperor Gaozu yielded the throne to Li Shimin, who became emperor (as Emperor Taizong). He initially made Yang Gongren to be the governor of the capital prefecture Yong Prefecture (雍州), and then made him the assistant to the commandant at Yang Prefecture (揚州, roughly modern Yangzhou) -- Emperor Taizong's favorite son Li Tai the Prince of Yue. (As Li Tai did not actually report to Yang Prefecture, Yang Gongren was effectively commandant.) In 631, he became the commandant at Luo Prefecture (洛州, roughly modern Luoyang, Henan), an important location as the effective eastern capital. At a later point, he retired, although the year of his retirement was not clear.

It was said at this time that Yang Gongren was humble and courteous, even to people who were below him in rank, and was compared to the humble Han dynasty chancellor Shi Qing (石慶). His clan became an honored one, as his younger brother Yang Shidao married Emperor Gaozu's daughter Princess Guiyang; his niece was wife and princess of Li Yuanji and later became a favorite concubine of Emperor Taizong; and his nephew Yang Sijing (楊思敬) married another daughter of Emperor Gaozu, the Princess Anping.

Yang died in 639. He was given posthumous honored and buried near the tomb of Emperor Taizong's wife Empress Zhangsun, which would eventually become Emperor Taizong's tomb as well.
