= Crown Prince Zhanghuai (Tang dynasty) =

Chinese crown prince (655–684)

Li Xian
- Crown Prince Zhanghuai
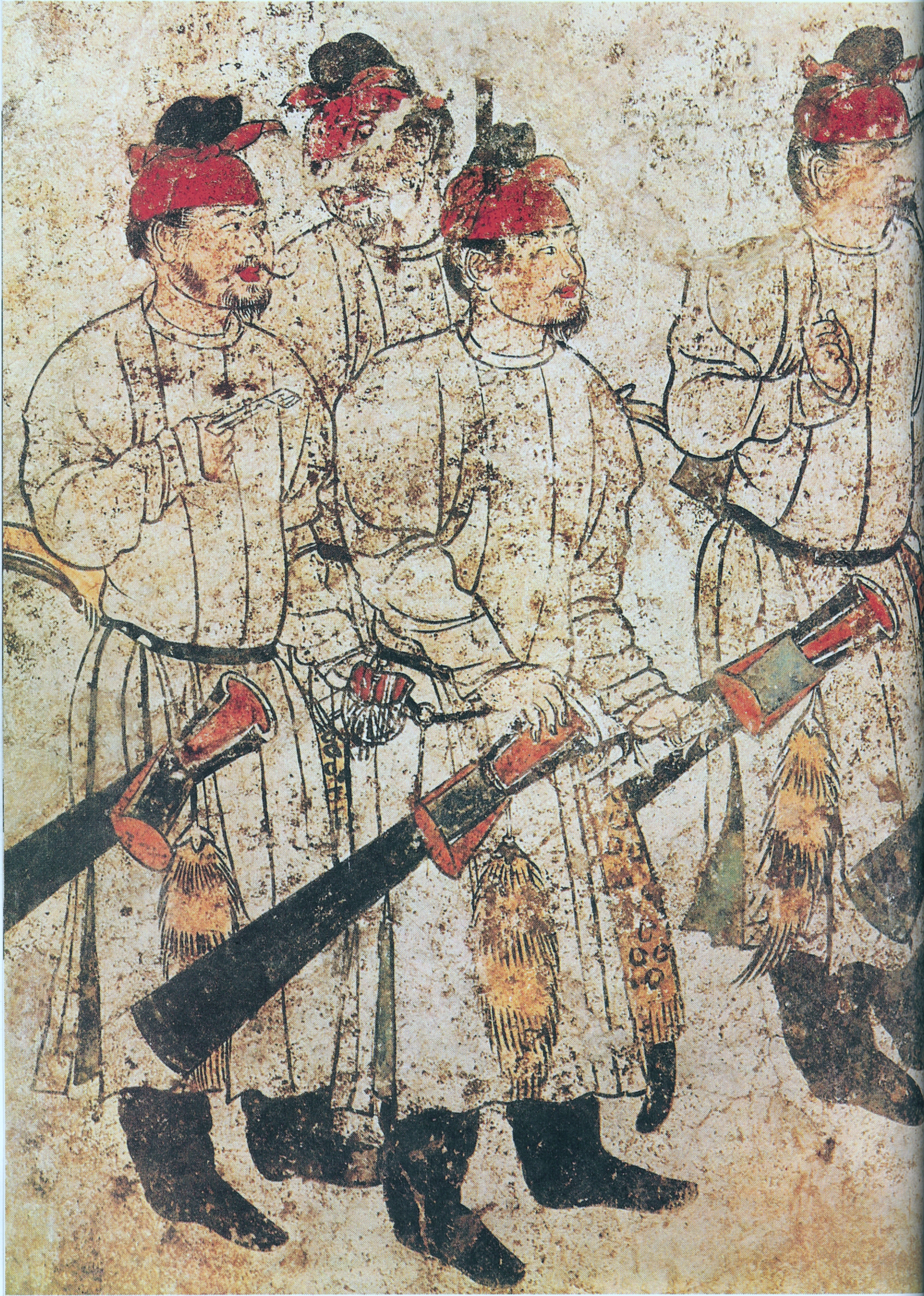
- Figures in a cortege, from a mural of Li Xian's tomb at Qianling Mausoleum, dated 706 AD; each figure measures approximately 1.6 m (63 in) in height.

Crown Prince of the Tang dynasty
- Reign: 675–680
- Predecessor: Li Hong
- Successor: Emperor Zhongzong of Tang

Prince of Yong 雍王
- Reign: 673–675

Prince of Pei 沛王
- Reign: 662–673

Prince of Lu 潞王
- Reign: 655–662
- Born: 29 January 655
- Died: 13 March 684 (aged 29)
- Spouse: Lady Fang (Princess of Yong); Lady Zhang (Liangdi)
- Issue: Li Guangshun, Prince of Lu; Li Shouli; Li Shouyi, Prince of Bi; Princess Changshun
- Father: Emperor Gaozong of Tang
- Mother: Wu Zetian

Li Xian (Chinese: 李賢; pinyin: Lǐ Xián; Wade–Giles: Li Hsien) (29 January 655 – 13 March 684), courtesy name Mingyun (Chinese: 明允; pinyin: Míngyǔn), formally Crown Prince Zhanghuai (Chinese: 章懷太子; pinyin: Zhānghuái Tàizǐ), named Li De (Chinese: 李德; pinyin: Lǐ Dé) from 675 to 680, was a crown prince of the Chinese Tang dynasty. He was the sixth son of Emperor Gaozong, and the second son of his second wife Empress Wu (later known as Wu Zetian). He was known for writing commentaries for the Book of Later Han, the official history of the Eastern Han dynasty. He became crown prince in 675 after his older brother Li Hong's death (which traditional historians believed to be a poisoning by Empress Wu), but soon fell out of favor and generosity with Empress Wu herself, which caused his downfall. In 680, Empress Wu had her associates accuse Li Xian of treason, and he was demoted to commoner rank and exiled. In 684, after Emperor Gaozong's death, Empress Wu, then empress dowager, had her associate Qiu Shenji (丘神勣) visit Li Xian to force him to commit suicide.

In 706, his younger brother Emperor Zhongzong provided Li Xian with an honorable burial by interring his remains at the Qianling Mausoleum.

== Background ==
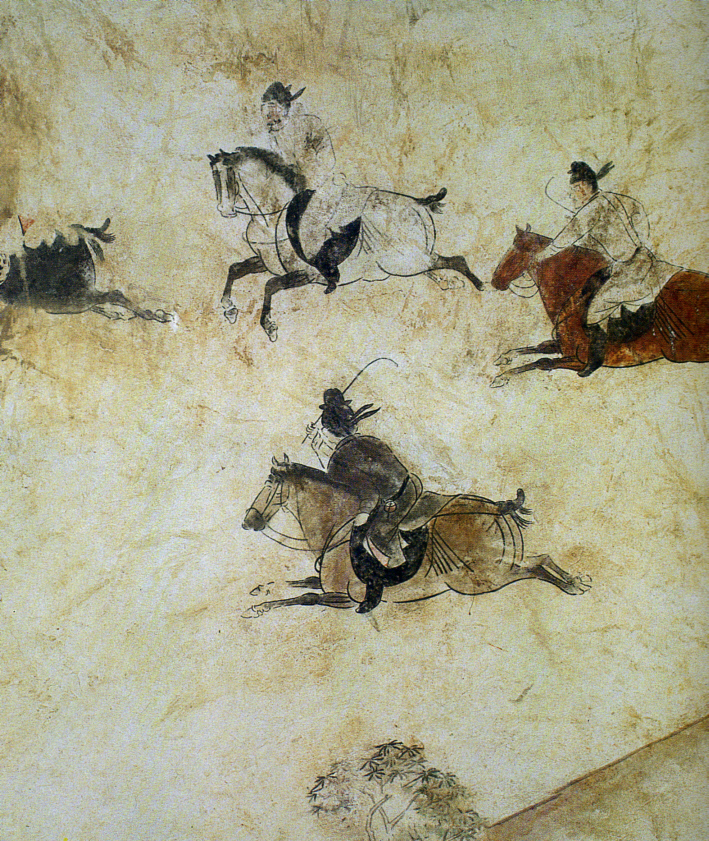
"Polo players at their game", detail on the west wall of a tomb pathway of Prince Zhanghuai's tomb, interred in 706 AD during the Tang dynasty. The tomb is part of the larger Qianling Mausoleum near modern-day Xi'an (formerly Chang'an, the Tang capital).

Li Xian was born on 29 January 655, as the sixth son of Emperor Gaozong and the second son of his then-favorite concubine Consort Wu (later known as Wu Zetian). There were, however, persistent rumors inside the palace that he was not actually born of Consort Wu but of her older sister Wu Shun (who was later created the Lady of Han).

In 655, the same year that his mother Consort Wu displaced Emperor Gaozong's first wife Empress Wang as empress, Li Xian was created the Prince of Lu. In 656, he was initially titularly given the post of prefect of Qi Prefecture (岐州, roughly modern Baoji, Shaanxi), and then the dual posts as prefect of the capital prefecture Yong Prefecture (雍州, roughly modern Xi'an, Shaanxi) and commandant at You Prefecture (幽州, roughly modern Beijing).

It was said that his behavior was elegant, even in his youth, and, according to a comment that Emperor Gaozong made to the chancellor Li Ji, he had studied the Classic of History, Classic of Rites, Analects, and a number of ancient poems and could remember them clearly. In 661, his title was changed to Prince of Pei, and he was given the titles of commandant at Yang Prefecture (揚州, roughly modern Yangzhou, Jiangsu) and major general, but he continued to also serve as prefect of Yong Prefecture. At this time, he had the literarily talented official Wang Bo on staff.

Around this time, the princes were apparently often engaged in cockfighting. Wang Bo wrote a playful piece entitled the Declaration Against the Prince of Zhou's Cock (檄周王雞文) (the Prince of Zhou was Li Xian's younger brother Li Xiǎn (note different tone), later named Li Zhe), which, however, when Emperor Gaozong read it, caused Emperor Gaozong to be angry, as he believed this would cause discord between his sons, and therefore expelled Wang from the Pei mansion.

In 672, Li Xian's title was changed to Prince of Yong, and he was given the titles of commandant at Liang Prefecture (涼州, roughly modern Wuwei, Gansu), but continued to also serve as general and prefect of Yong Prefecture. His name was also changed to Li De. In 674, his name was changed back to Li Xian.

== As crown prince ==
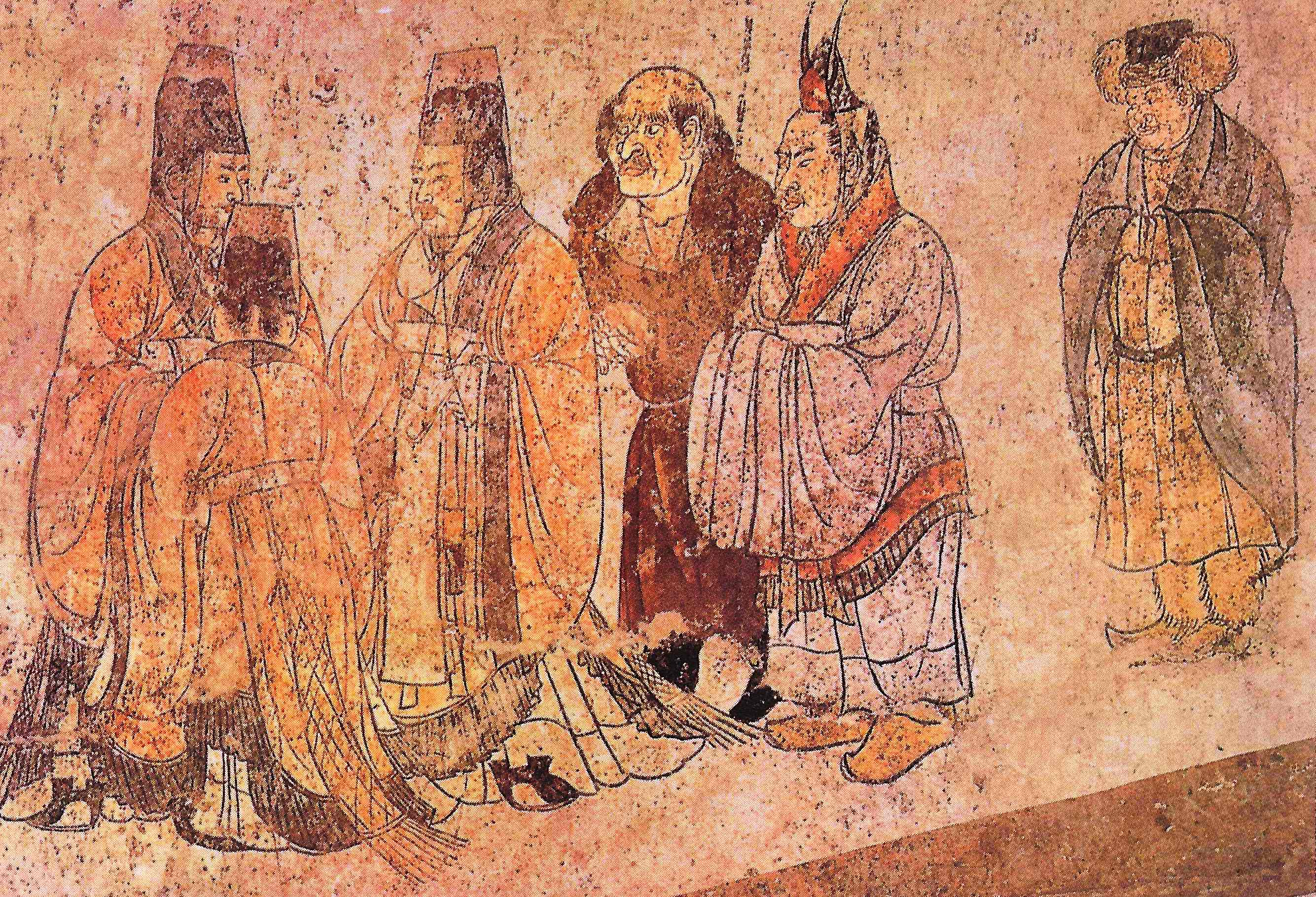
From Paludan's source: "In this mural foreign ambassadors are being received at court. The two elegantly clad figures on the right are from Korea, the bare-headed, large-nosed figure in the center is an envoy from the west. Mural from Li Xian's tomb, Qianling Mausoleum, Shaanxi, 706."

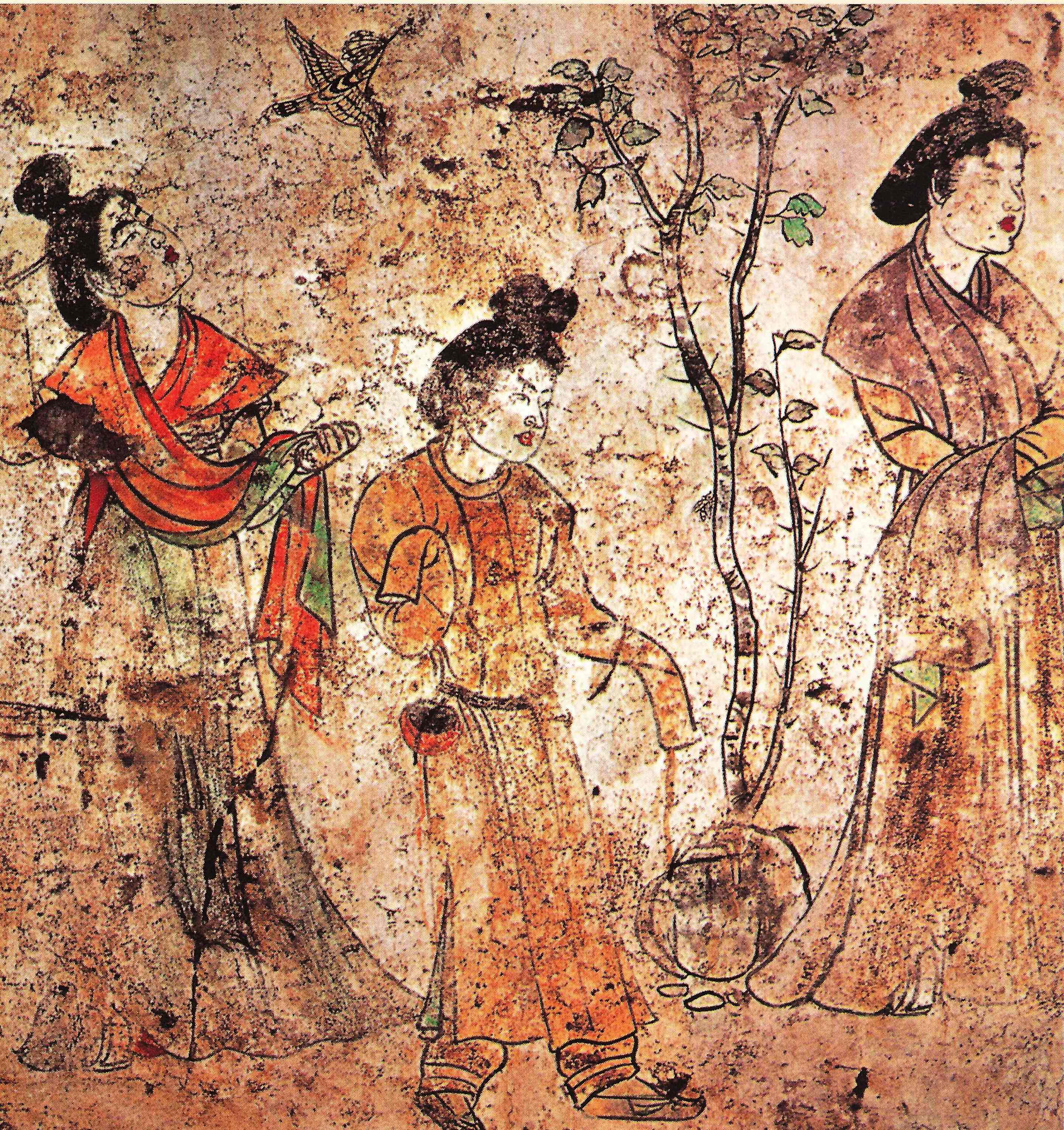
From Paludan's source: "A group of palace ladies in the gardens while a hoopoe flies by. Mural, tomb of Gaozong's 6th son, Li Xian, Qianling, Shaanxi, 706."

In 675, Li Xian's older brother Li Hong the crown prince died—a death that traditional historians generally believed to be a poisoning ordered by Empress Wu. On July 3, Li Xian was created crown prince to replace Li Hong. Emperor Gaozong soon ordered that much of government matters be ruled on by Li Xian, But because most of the imperial work was done by Empress Wu, his decisions were under her mother's control. But Li Xian was praised for making good decisions. Also around this time, Li Xian led a group of scholars, including Zhang Da'an, Liu Nayan (劉訥言), Ge Xiyuan (格希元), Xu Shuya (許叔牙), Cheng Xuanyi (成玄一), Shi Cangzhu (史藏諸), and Zhou Baoning (周寶寧), in writing commentaries for the Book of Later Han, the official history of the Eastern Han dynasty, written by the Liu Song scholar Fan Ye.

Meanwhile, Li Xian's relationship with Empress Wu began to deteriorate, as Li Xian had heard the rumors that he was actually the son of Lady of Han, and had become fearful. Empress Wu, detecting this, had her literary staff write two works entitled, Good Examples for Shaoyang (少陽正範, "Shaoyang" being an oblique term for a crown prince) and Biographies of Filial Sons (孝子傳) and gave them to Li Xian, and further wrote a number of letters rebuking Li Xian, making him more fearful. At the same time, Empress Wu relieved his duties as head of many government decisions and changed all of Li Xian's previous policies. Further, when the sorcerer Ming Chongyan (明崇儼), who was well-trusted by Emperor Gaozong and Empress Wu, was assassinated in 679, Empress Wu suspected Li Xian—as Ming had been known to repeatedly make comments to Empress Wu that included, "The Crown Prince cannot bear the responsibilities of state. The Prince of Ying [(i.e., Li Xian's younger brother Li Zhe, later Emperor Zhongzong] has an appearance most similar to Emperor Taizong ([Emperor Gaozong's father])," and "The Prince of Xiang [(i.e., Li Xian's younger brother Li Dan, later Emperor Ruizong)] has the most honorable appearance."

Meanwhile, Li Xian was also known for his liking of music and women. (Note: Some historians, pointing to oblique references that he was "particularly close" to a number of male servants, also believe that he liked sexual relations with both women and men.) When Empress Wu heard this, she had people report the news to Emperor Gaozong, who then ordered an investigation, led by the officials Xue Yuanchao, Pei Yan, and Gao Zhizhou. When they searched the crown prince's stables, they found several hundred suits of black armor, and they believed this to be evidence of a coup. After interrogation, one of Li Xian's favorite servants, Zhao Daosheng (趙道生), admitted to assassinating Ming on Li Xian's orders. Emperor Gaozong, who had favored Li Xian, considered pardoning him, but Empress Wu refused, and she asked him to be quiet. On September 20, 680, Emperor Gaozong deposed Li Xian and reduced him to commoner rank, delivering him from the eastern capital Luoyang (where Emperor Gaozong and Empress Wu had long taken up residence) to the capital Chang'an to be imprisoned there. His close associates were executed, and the seized armor was burned publicly to demonstrate Li Xian's treason. Li Zhe was created crown prince to replace him.

== After removal ==
In 683, Li Xian was moved from Chang'an to Ba Prefecture (巴州, roughly modern Bazhong, Sichuan). In 684, after Emperor Gaozong's death, Li Zhe initially took the throne (as Emperor Zhongzong), but soon was deposed himself due to signs of disobedience to Empress Wu (now empress dowager), and Li Dan became emperor instead (as Emperor Ruizong), although Empress Dowager Wu retained all powers as regent. In spring 684, she sent the general Qiu Shenji to Ba Prefecture with the order of, "Examine the house of Li Xian the former crown prince to prevent external attacks." However, she hinted to him that he should have Li Xian killed. When he got to Ba Prefecture, he placed Li Xian into a small room and forced him to commit suicide. When news of Li Xian's death arrived at Luoyang, Empress Wu publicly blamed Qiu and demoted him to the post of prefect of Die Prefecture (疊州, roughly modern Gannan Tibetan Autonomous Prefecture, Gansu), while publicly mourning Li Xian and posthumously creating him the title of Prince of Yong.However, Qiu was soon recalled to Luoyang to again be general. After Empress Wu's death in 705 and the restoration of Emperor Zhongzong to the throne, Emperor Zhongzong had Li Xian's casket returned to Chang'an, to be buried near the tomb of Emperor Gaozong. After Emperor Ruizong became emperor again in 710, he had Li Xian's crown prince title restored.

== Family ==
Consorts and their issue(s):

- Crown Princess Jing, of the Fang clan of Qinghe (章懷太子妃 清河房氏; 658 – 6 July 711)
- Liangdi, of the Zhang clan (良娣 张氏), personal name Nanyang (南阳)
  - Li Shouli, Heredetary Prince of Yong (李守礼嗣雍王, 672–741), 2nd son
- Unknown:
  - Li Guangshun, Prince of Shun (李光顺莒王), 1st son
  - Li Shouyi, Prince of Bi (毕王 李守义), 3rd son
  - Lady Changxin (长信郡主), 1st daughter (Note: She was demoted to xianzhu (literally mistress of prefecture), and her later fate was unknown.)

None of the sons was born by Princess Fang. Whether Princess Fang mothered Lady Changxin was also unknown
