= Li Hong =

Chinese crown prince (652–675)

Li Hong 李弘

Crown Prince of the Tang dynasty
- Tenure: 656–675
- Predecessor: Li Zhong
- Successor: Li Xian

Prince of Dai
- Reign: 655–656
- Born: 652; Chang'an, Tang China
- Died: 25 May 675 (aged 23); Hebi Palace, Luoyang, Tang China
- Spouse: Lady Pei (Note: Crown Princess (太子妃) and daughter of Pei Judao (裴居道). However, they were childless. Following her husband who was posthumously honoured as emperor, she was similarly honoured, as "Empress Ai" (哀皇后).)
- Issue: Li Longji, Emperor Xuanzong of Tang (adopted) (Note: Initially was the third son of Emperor Ruizong of Tang, but by Wu Zetian's order, he became the adopted son of the posthumous emperor, who was childless.)
Names
- Family name: Li (李); Given name: Hong (弘)
Posthumous name
- Emperor Xiaojing (孝敬皇帝; lit. ''the filial and respectful emperor'')
Temple name
- Yizong (義宗)
- House: Li
- Dynasty: Tang
- Father: Emperor Gaozong of Tang
- Mother: Empress Zetian

Li Hong (652 – 25 May 675) (Note: The Zizhi Tongjian recorded that Li died on the jihai day of the 4th month of the 2nd year of the Shangyuan era of Tang Gaozong's reign. This corresponds to 25 May 675 in the Gregorian calendar. Li Hong's biographies in both Books of Tang recorded that he was 24 (by East Asian reckoning) when he died.) was a crown prince of the Tang dynasty of China. He was the fifth son of Emperor Gaozong and the eldest son of his second wife Empress Wu (popularly known as Wu Zetian). After being titled Prince of Dai (代王) in 655, he became crown prince in 656. As he grew older, he often came in conflict with his ambitious and powerful mother and it is believed by traditional historians that she poisoned him to death in 675. His father Emperor Gaozong, then still reigning, posthumously honored him with an imperial title.

== Background ==
Li Hong's mother Consort Wu had been a concubine of Emperor Taizong. After Emperor Taizong's death in 649, she, like all of his surviving concubines who did not bear children, was sent to Ganye Temple (感業寺) to be a Buddhist nun. However in 650 or 651 Emperor Gaozong, Emperor Taizong's son and successor, visited Ganye Temple to offer incense. He saw Wu Zetian and remembered how he had been impressed by her beauty, and both of them wept. Emperor Gaozong's wife Empress Wang heard about this situation and decided to invite Consort Wu back to the palace to divert Gaozon's favour away from Consort Xiao. Empress Wang at the time did not have any sons and felt threatened by Xiao who was a favourite of Gaozong who had given birth to a son, Li Sujie. Consort Wu soon became his favorite and she gave birth to Li Hong in 652. Li Hong was Emperor Gaozong's fifth son and her first son. In 653, he was made the Prince of Dai. Emperor Gaozong's oldest son Li Zhong, who had been born to a lowly-born concubine Consort Liu, had been made the crown prince already. However, by that time Consort Wu had done away with her rivals. In 655, Consort Wu falsely accused Empress Wang and her mother Lady Liu of using witchcraft and of murdering her daughter. Emperor Gaozong deposed both Empress Wang and Consort Xiao and replaced Empress Wang with Consort Wu. Empress Wang and Consort Xiao were then executed on Empress Wu's orders. Wu used her uncontested position to get her ally in court, the official Xu Jingzong, to submit a petition. He argued that now that the empress had her own sons, Li Zhong should step aside. Emperor Gaozong agreed, and in spring 656, Emperor Gaozong demoted Li Zhong to the title of Prince of Liang and made Li Hong the crown prince instead.

== As crown prince ==
As Li Hong grew in age, he developed a reputation for studiousness and kindness. He at one point studied the Zuo Zhuan under the official Guo Yu (郭瑜); when they reached the records dealing with how King Mu of Chu had killed his father King Cheng, Li Hong became distressed even reading about the incident. Guo pointed out that studying history was important so that history would not be repeated but he remained distressed, so Guo advised him to study the Classic of Rites instead.

In 661, under Li Hong's orders, Xu Jingzong, Xu Yushi, Shangguan Yi, and Yang Sijian (楊思儉) compiled a collection of particularly beautiful writing into a 500-volume work entitled the Yaoshan Yucai (瑤山玉彩, literally "the Colors of Jade from Mount Yao") and presented it to Emperor Gaozong. Li Hong, as well as those officials, were rewarded with silk.

Around the new year 669, after Tang forces commanded by Li Ji had conquered Goguryeo in 668, Li Hong after noticing the harshness of Emperor Gaozong's prior edict that conscripted soldiers who deserted would be beheaded and their wives and children forced into servitude, submitted a petition. In it he pointed out that at times the alleged deserters were in fact innocent—that they could have been ill, captured by Goguryeo forces without anyone realizing it, drowned while sailing on the way to the Goguryeo front, or been stuck behind Goguryeo lines. He requested that the penalty to the alleged deserters' families be removed, and Emperor Gaozong agreed.

In 671, perhaps due to Empress Wu's distaste for the capital Chang'an due to her recurring dreams of Empress Wang and Consort Xiao taking vengeance on her, Emperor Gaozong and Empress Wu took up residence at the eastern capital Luoyang. They rarely returned to Chang'an from that point on. Li Hong was left in charge at Chang'an, although it was said that he was often ill and the decisions were largely made by his staff members Dai Zhide, Zhang Wenguan, and Xiao Dezhao (蕭德昭). However, several acts of kindness were attributed to Li Hong. Most notably, during a major famine in Guanzhong, the capital region, Li Hong realized that even his own guards were eating acorns and tree barks. In response he distributed rice from the imperial storage, and distributing public lands at Tong Prefecture (同州, roughly modern Weinan, Shaanxi) to the poor.

== Death and aftermath ==
One of Li Hong's kind acts caused a deterioration of his relationship with his mother Empress Wu. Consort Xiao's daughters Princess Yiyang and Gao'an had, because of their mother, been put under house arrest inside the palace. Once, when Li Hong met them by chance, he took pity on them and requested the Emperor Gaozong allow them to marry. Emperor Gaozong agreed, this displeased Empress Wu and in anger she immediately married them to two palace guards named Quan Yi (權毅) and Wang Xu (王勗). Empress Wu's increasing power led to Li Hong and his brother Li Xian to become concerned. The relationship between mother and son further deteriorated over Li Hong's repeated suggestions to Empress Wu that she not be so controlling of governmental affairs and asked her to hand over control of the government to him.

At a later point, by order of Empress Wu, Li Hong was no longer in command at Chang'an, and he went to Luoyang to join his parents. There, he married his wife Crown Princess Pei, the daughter of the general Pei Judao.

In 675, Li Hong, while visiting with his parents the Hebi Palace (合璧宮) near Luoyang, died suddenly. Most traditional historians believed that Empress Wu poisoned him to death, but that is just speculation. (Note: In his Zizhi Tongjian Kaoyi, Sima Guang noted that Gaozong's biography in New Book of Tang recorded that Wu "killed the taizi", while Li Hong's biography in the same work recorded that he died via poisoning. The Tang Li recorded that Li Hong "did not live to his natural lifespan". Both the Tang Shilu and Old Book of Tang did not record that Li Hong was poisoned. Sima also claimed that Emperor Suzong's advisor Li Bi told the emperor that "Xiaojing (Li Hong's posthumous name) was poisoned". Sima then theorized that the record in New Book of Tang was based on this conversation and the indirect record found in the Tang Li. Sima's own opinion was that it was impossible to accurately determine the cause of Li Hong's death. But, since people at the time did suspect Wu of poisoning Li Hong, it was necessary to record down these suspicions and pass them on to future generations as suspicions.) His death was most likely caused by his tuberculosis. Emperor Gaozong was greatly saddened by his son's death, and in an unprecedented move, posthumously honored Li Hong the title of Emperor Xiaojing and ordered that he be buried with honors due an emperor. However, when an imperial tomb was to be built for Li Hong, it was said that the conscripted laborers were so displeased at the labor that they simply threw the construction materials they had and deserted.

Li Hong had no sons. For a while, his nephew, Li Longji (the later Emperor Xuanzong), the son of Li Dan (the later Emperor Ruizong), was posthumously adopted into his line. During the reign of his brother Emperor Zhongzong, he was worshiped at the imperial temple (with the temple name of Yizong), and his wife, Crown Princess Pei, was posthumously honored Empress Ai and worshiped there as well. However, after Emperor Zhongzong's death and succession by Emperor Ruizong in 710, the chancellors Yao Yuanzhi and Song Jing pointed out that it was inappropriate that Li Hong, who did not actually take the throne, to be worshipped with emperors; an edict was then issued in Ruizong's name on 2 November, declaring that a separate temple was to be built at Luoyang. In c.February 718, during the reign of Emperor Xuanzong, the separate temple at Luoyang was completed, and Li Hong was worshipped there instead. He was also no longer referred to by the temple name of Yizong.

== Notes and references ==
- Old Book of Tang, vol. 86.
- New Book of Tang, vol. 81.
- Zizhi Tongjian, vols. 200, 201, 202
