= Zhu Qinming =

Zhu Qinming (Chinese: 祝欽明), courtesy name Wensi (文思), was an official of the Tang and Wu Zhou dynasties of China, serving as a chancellor under Emperor Zhongzong. He was a renowned Confucian scholar but was later disgraced after Emperor Zhongzong's death for having flattered Emperor Zhongzong's powerful wife Empress Wei.

== Background ==
It is not known when Zhu Qinming was born, but it is known that his family was from the Tang dynasty capital Chang'an. His father Zhu Lin (祝綝) was himself a renowned scholar who wrote a number of works comparing the various interpretations of the Confucian classics. After one of Zhu Lin's students, Zhang Houyin (張後胤), became an important official, Zhang recommended Zhu Lin to serve as an official as well, but Zhu Lin was never promoted beyond the post of being a county magistrate.

Zhu Qinming was said to have understood the Five Classics well in his youth, and also studied the histories and the philosophies of the other schools of thought. During the reign of Emperor Gaozong, after passing the imperial examinations, he served as a low level official at the legislative bureau of government (東臺, Dongtai). Sometime between Emperor Gaozong's Yongchun era (682–683) and the Tianshou era (690–692) (by which time Emperor Gaozong's wife Wu Zetian had declared herself "emperor" of a new Zhou dynasty, interrupting Tang), he passed additional imperial examinations and became Zhuzuo Lang (著作郎), one of the officials in charge of chronicling the acts of the emperor. In 701, he started serving on staff of Wu Zetian's son and crown prince Li Xian, a former emperor, and also served as an imperial scholar. He had the duty of assisting Li Xian in his studies.

== During Emperor Zhongzong's second reign ==
In 705, Wu Zetian was overthrown in a coup, and Li Xian was restored to the throne (as Emperor Zhongzong). On account of Zhu Qinming's service to him, he promoted Zhu to be Guozi Jijiu (國子祭酒), the principal of the imperial university, and further gave him the designation Tong Zhongshu Menxia Sanpin (同中書門下三品), making him a chancellor de facto. He was soon made the minister of justice (刑部尚書, Xingbu Shangshu) and then the minister of rites (禮部尚書, Libu Shangshu). He was also created the Duke of Lu and given the honorific title of Yinqing Guanglu Daiful (銀青光祿大夫). The coup leaders Huan Yanfan, Cui Xuanwei, Yuan Shuji, and Jing Hui, themselves now powerful chancellors (although they would soon lose power due to the machinations of Emperor Zhongzong's powerful wife Empress Wei and her lover and Emperor Zhongzong's trusted cousin Wu Sansi), became his students in studying the Rites of Zhou, and Zhu was well respected. He was put in charge of editing the imperial history. However, in 706, he would have a brief downfall—as he was indicted by the censor Xiao Zhizhong of having hidden a parent's death to avoid serving a mourning period, a severe breach of the Confucian requirements for filial piety—and was demoted to be the prefect of Shen Prefecture (申州, roughly modern Xinyang, Henan).

Zhu, worried that he would never again be returned to power, took to flattering Empress Wei, and was soon recalled to again be the principal of the imperial university. In 709, when Emperor Zhongzong was set to sacrifice to heaven and earth south of Chang'an, Zhu and his deputy, Guo Shanyun (郭山惲), in order to flatter Empress Wei, took an interpretation of the Rites of Zhou to mean that Empress Wei should serve as the second stage sacrificer. Emperor Zhongzong initially doubted this interpretation and requested further opinions from scholars. Two scholars from the ministry of ceremonies, Tang Shao (唐紹) and Jiang Qinxu (蔣欽緒), as well as another deputy of Zhu's, Chu Wuliang (褚無量), spoke against this interpretation and argued that such interpretation would only be reasonable in sacrifices to the imperial ancestors. Emperor Zhongzong had the chancellor Wei Juyuan rule on this matter, and Wei Juyuan ruled for Zhu's proposal, thus allowing Empress Wei to serve as the second stage sacrificer. However, with Tang's and Jiang's objection, he rejected a further proposal of Zhu's that Emperor Zhongzong's powerful daughter Li Guo'er the Princess Anle serve as third stage sacrificer, instead making Wei Juyuan the third stage sacrificer. During a feast in 710 after one of Empress Wei's relatives was married, Zhu volunteered to perform a dance known as Bafeng Wu (八風舞) – during which he shook his obese body, his head, and rolled his eyes around, drawing laughter from Emperor Zhongzong but secret disgust from other officials.

== After Emperor Zhongzong's death ==
In summer 710, Emperor Zhongzong died suddenly—a death that traditional historians believed to be a poisoning carried out by Empress Wei and Li Guo'er. Soon, though, Empress Wei was overthrown in a coup led by Emperor Zhongzong's sister Princess Taiping and his nephew Li Longji the Prince of Linzi. Emperor Zhongzong's brother Li Dan the Prince of Xiang, himself a former emperor, was restored to the throne (as Emperor Ruizong). After Emperor Ruizong took the throne, the censor Ni Ruoshui (倪若水) indicted Zhu Qinming and Guo Shanyun for flattering Empress Wei and misleading Emperor Zhongzong. Emperor Ruizong demoted Zhu to be the prefect of Rao Prefecture (饒州, roughly modern Shangrao, Jiangxi). At a later point, he was recalled to be an imperial scholar at Chongwen Pavilion (崇文館), and died while serving in that role.
