= Wei Chengqing =

Chinese official (c.640–c.706)

Wei Chengqing (Chinese: 韋承慶; 640?–706?), courtesy name Yanxiu (延休), posthumous name Viscount Wen of Fuyang (扶陽溫子), was an official of the Chinese Tang and Wu Zhou dynasties, serving as a chancellor during Wu Zetian's reign.

== Background ==
Wei Chengqing might have been born in 640, during the reign of Emperor Gaozong. His father Wei Siqian was a mid-level official at the time (and would eventually serve as chancellor from 685 to 687, during the first reign of Emperor Gaozong's son Emperor Ruizong). He had at least one younger half-brother, Wei Chengqing, born of Lady Wang, a later wife of Wei Siqian. It was said that Lady Wang was very strict in her discipline of Wei Chengqing because he was not born of her, and whenever she punished Wei Chengqing, Wei Sili would ask to be punished in Wei Chengqing's stead – and when she refused, he would have the household servants punish him in the same manner Lady Wang was punishing Wei Chengqing. Lady Wang saw this and realized that she needed to give Wei Chengqing better treatment. When others heard of this, they compared the Wei brothers to the Jin Dynasty (266–420) officials Wang Xiang and Wang Lan (王覽) – half-brothers in a situation similar to the Wei brothers.

After Wei Chengqing passed the imperial examination, he became the military advisor to Emperor Gaozong's son Li Xian the Prince of Yong, but was in charge of drafting important documents on Li Xian's staff, and it was said that he wrote in a beautiful style. After Li Xian became crown prince in 675, he continued to serve on Li Xian's staff. In 679, when Emperor Gaozong transferred some of the imperial authority to Li Xian, it was said that Li Xian began to favor luxuries and pleasures, and Wei submitted a petition urging him to curb behavior – a petition that Li Xian appreciated and thanked him for. Wei, also believing that people's anxieties largely came from their own creation, wrote an ode entitled the Ode of Ling Tower (靈臺賦), to both satirize the people's lack of inner peace and to show what his own intentions were. After Li Xian was removed as crown prince in 680 (after offending his mother, Emperor Gaozong's powerful empress Empress Wu (later known as Wu Zetian)), Wei was sent out of the capital to serve as the magistrate of Wucheng County (烏程, in modern Huzhou, Zhejiang), and it was said that he much improved the culture of the county.

== During Wu Zetian's reign ==
During the Changshou era (692-694), by which time Empress Wu had established her own Zhou dynasty as its "emperor," interrupting Tang, Wei Chengqing served as Fengge Sheren (鳳閣舍人), a mid-level official at the legislative bureau of government (鳳閣, Fengge), and was further given the responsibility to select officials at the ministry of civil service affairs (天官部, Tianguan Bu). It was said that he wrote important documents quickly and proficiently, but at times offended powerful people, and therefore was sent out of the palace to serve as the prefect of Xin Prefecture (忻州, roughly modern Xinzhou, Shanxi), but was soon recalled to serve in the same capacities as before. Sometime before 699, he was removed on account of illness—and Wu Zetian had his brother Wei Sili succeed him. Wei Chengqing himself was made a member of the staff of Li Xian the Crown Prince (note different character than the first crown prince he served). He later successively served as the prefect of Yu Prefecture (豫州, roughly modern Zhumadian, Henan), and then Guo Prefecture (虢州, part of modern Sanmenxia, Henan). He was eventually recalled to serve as deputy minister of civil service affairs (天官侍郎, Tianguan Shilang), and was also responsible for editing the imperial history. It was said that people praised him for fairness during the three terms that he served in being responsible for selecting officials.

In 704, Wei Chengqing was made Fengge Shilang (鳳閣侍郎), the deputy head of the legislative bureau, and he was also given the designation Tong Fengge Luantai Pingzhangshi (同鳳閣鸞臺平章事), making him a chancellor de facto. As Wu Zetian did not wish to have two members of the same clan serving as chancellors simultaneously, Wei Sili, who was then chancellor as well, was made the principal of the imperial university. Meanwhile, there had been accusations against Wu Zetian's lover Zhang Changzong that he had permitted the fortuneteller Li Hongtai (李弘泰) to foretell that he had the appearance of an emperor, and Wu Zetian had Wei Chengqing, Cui Shenqing (崔神慶), and Song Jing investigate. Wei and Cui, after investigation, concluded that Li Hongtai should be prosecuted, but Zhang should not, as he had reported what Li Hongtai said to Wu Zetian. Song insisted on investigating, but to no avail, as Wu Zetian protected Zhang.

== During Emperor Zhongzong's second reign ==
In spring 705, when a coup led by Zhang Jianzhi, Cui Xuanwei, Jing Hui, Huan Yanfan, and Yuan Shuji overthrew Wu Zetian and restored Li Xian, a former emperor, to the throne (as Emperor Zhongzong), her lovers Zhang Changzong and Zhang Yizhi (Zhang Changzong's brother) were killed. On the same day, Wei Chengqing, along with fellow chancellor Fang Rong and Cui Shenqing), were accused of being associates of Zhang Yizhi and Zhang Changzong and arrested. However, at that time, an imperial edict announcing a general pardon had to be drafted, and despite the fact that Wei was under arrest, the other officials still believed that no one could write it as well as he could, and so he was put in charge of drafting it. His style was said to be so beautiful despite the dangers that surrounded him that all who read the edict praised it. After half a month, Wei was demoted to be the sheriff of Gaoyao County (高要, in modern Zhaoqing, Guangdong). After about a year, he was promoted to be the prefect of Chen Prefecture (辰州, roughly modern Huaihua, Hunan), but even before he reported to Chen Prefecture, was recalled to serve as honorary Mishu Shaojian (秘書少監, deputy head of the archival bureau, although in this case without actual authority) and again made an imperial historian. He was also created the Viscount of Fuyang. Emperor Zhongzong had him draft a memorial text for Wu Zetian, and once he completed it, praised him for its beauty, giving him the honorific title Yinqing Guanglu Daifu (銀青光祿大夫). He was soon commissioned to be Huangmen Shilang (黃門侍郎), the deputy head of the examination bureau (門下省, Menxia Sheng), but died of illness before he could take office. Emperor Zhongzong mourned him greatly and recalled Wei Sili, then serving as a prefectural prefect, to succeed him.

== Notes and references ==
- Old Book of Tang, vol. 88.
- New Book of Tang, vol. 116.
- Zizhi Tongjian, vols. 202, 206, 207, 208.
