= Fang Rong =

Fang Rong (房融) per the biography of his son Fang Guan.) was an official of Wu Zetian's Zhou dynasty, briefly serving as chancellor.

Despite Fang's high status, little is firmly established about his career except for the time that he served as chancellor—as, unusual for a chancellor, he did not have a biography in either the Old Book of Tang or the New Book of Tang. It is known that his clan traced its ancestry to the early Jin dynasty (266–420) official Fang Qian (房乾), who was sent as an emissary to the Xianbei but was detained and not allowed to return to Jin, whose descendants then took the Xianbei surname Wuyin (屋引) and followed the rulers of Northern Wei back south. They then changed their name back to Fang when Emperor Xiaowen of Northern Wei changed Xianbei names to Han names in 496 and settled in the Northern Wei capital Luoyang. Fang Rong's ancestors served as officials in Northern Wei and succeeding dynasties Northern Qi, Sui dynasty, and Tang dynasty, with Fang Rong's father Fang Xuanji (房玄基) serving as a low level official at the department of the treasury.

As of 704, Fang Rong was serving as the secretary general of Huai Prefecture (懷州, roughly modern Jiaozuo, Henan), when he was promoted to be Zhengjian Daifu (正諫大夫), a senior advisor at the examination bureau of government (鸞臺, Luantai) and given the designation of Tong Fengge Luantai Pingzhangshi (同鳳閣鸞臺平章事), making him a chancellor de facto. In spring 705, when a coup led by Zhang Jianzhi, Cui Xuanwei, Jing Hui, Huan Yanfan, and Yuan Shuji overthrew Wu Zetian and restored her son Li Xian the Crown Prince, a former emperor, to the throne (as Emperor Zhongzong), her lovers Zhang Yizhi and Zhang Changzong were killed. On the same day, Fang, along with fellow chancellor Wei Chengqing and the minister Cui Shenqing (崔神慶), were accused of being associates of Zhang Yizhi and Zhang Changzong and arrested. Half a month later, Fang was reduced to commoner rank and exiled to Gao Prefecture (高州, roughly modern Maoming, Guangdong), and he died there. His son Fang Guan later served as a chancellor during the reign of Emperor Suzong.

== Notes and references ==
- Zizhi Tongjian, vol. 207.
