= Princess Anle =

Chinese princess of the Tang dynasty (died 710)

Princess Anle 安樂公主
- Born: 684? Fang Prefecture, Tang China
- Died: 21 July 710 (aged about 26) (Note: According to her mother Lady Wei's biography in the Old Book of Tang, Li Guo'er was killed on the dingwei day of the 6th month of the 4th year of the Jinglong era of Tang Zhongzong's reign. This date corresponds to 28 July 710 in the Gregorian calendar. However, the Zizhi Tongjian recorded that Li was killed on the gengzi day of the 6th month of the 1st year of the Jingyun era of Tang Ruizong's reign; this date corresponds to 21 July 710 on the Gregorian calendar.)
- Spouse: Wu Chongxun (武崇訓); Wu Yanxiu (武延秀)
- Issue: one son (Note: Fathered by Princess Anle's first husband; he was created Duke of Gao)
Names
- Li Guo'er (李裹兒)
Posthumous name
- 悖逆庶人 ("rebellious commoner")
- House: Tang dynasty
- Father: Emperor Zhongzong of Tang
- Mother: Empress Wei

Princess Anle (安樂公主; 684? (Note: Accounts of Li Guo'er's birth imply, but do not definitively state, that she was born during her parents' journey to their place of exile, which would make her birth in 684. See New Book of Tang, vol.83.) – 21 July 710), personal name Li Guo'er (李裹兒), was a Chinese princess of the Tang dynasty. She was the youngest daughter of Emperor Zhongzong and his wife Empress Wei. Popular history holds that she was doted upon heavily by her parents and siblings, which contributed to her later drive for power.

After Emperor Zhongzong died in 710 — a death that traditional historians assert was due to poison, and carried out by Empress Wei and Li Guo'er. A coup led by Li Guo'er's cousin Li Longji, the Prince of Linzi, and Princess Taiping, Li Guo'er's paternal aunt, overthrew and killed Empress Wei and Li Guo'er.

== Background ==
Li Guo'er was the youngest of four children that Emperor Zhongzong (Li Zhe) had with his wife Empress Wei. She is said to have been born at a time when Li Zhe had, after a brief reign in 684, been deposed by his mother Empress Dowager Wu (later known as Wu Zetian), reduced to the title of Prince of Lulin, and exiled to Fang Prefecture (房州, in modern Shiyan, Hubei). He was replaced by his brother Li Dan the Prince of Yu (as Emperor Ruizong). It was recorded in her biography in the New Book of Tang that at her birth, Li Zhe took off his shirt and wrapped her in it; thereafter, she was named Guo'er (meaning "the child that was wrapped"). The same biography also recorded that as she was born in times of trouble, Guo'er was pampered by her parents; Empress Wei, in particular, favoured her when she became older, as she was beautiful and eloquent.

In 698, at the urging of the chancellor Di Renjie, Wu Zetian (who had taken the throne herself in 690, reducing Li Dan to the rank of crown prince) recalled Li Zhe to the capital. Li Dan offered to yield the position of crown prince to Li Zhe, and Wu Zetian agreed, creating Li Zhe crown prince (and subsequently changing his name, first to Li Xian, and then to Wu Xian). Wu Zetian was surprised to see her and stated that she was likeness of herself. Sometime after the end of exile, Li Guo'er married Wu Chongxun (武崇訓) the Prince of Gaoyang, the son of Wu Zetian's nephew Wu Sansi the Prince of Liang.

== During Emperor Zhongzong's second reign ==
In 705, a coup led by Zhang Jianzhi, Cui Xuanwei, Jing Hui, Huan Yanfan, and Yuan Shuji overthrew Wu Zetian and restored Emperor Zhongzong to the throne. However, Wu Sansi, who was carrying on an affair with Empress Wei, became a trusted advisor of Emperor Zhongzong, and Zhang and his cohorts soon lost power (and eventually all were killed or died in exile in 706). Li Guo'er and Emperor Zhongzong's concubine Consort Shangguan Wan'er also became powerful figures. Li Guo'er, in particular, as she was favored by both Emperor Zhongzong and Empress Wei, was said to be powerful, arrogant, and corrupt.

In spring 706, Emperor Zhongzong issued an edict that, in an unprecedented manner, established staffs for seven princesses: his sister Princess Taiping; his daughters Princesses Changning, Yicheng, Xindu, Ding'an, and Anle; and Princess Jincheng, the daughter of his cousin Li Shouli the Prince of Yong. It was said that among the seven, Li Guo'er had a particularly large staff, and she also sold governmental offices, even to people who were of low social stations, as long as they had the money. Because the offices she sold had their commissions placed in envelopes that were sealed in a slanted manner to indicate that they need not be approved by the examination bureau (門下省, Menxia Sheng), they were known as the "slanted-sealed officials" (斜封官, xiefeng guan). She even murdered officials who opposed her, wrongfully occupied lands belonging to others, captured free people, especially children, as slaves, and engaged in other illegal activities. She spent money recklessly, building many magnificent buildings, palaces, parks, and temples on a large scale, especially on behalf of her father, which caused great strain on the imperial treasury and the burden of the common people. Although her father was aware of these violations, corruptions, and indiscretions, he refused to reprimand her. It was said that at times, she would even draft edicts for Emperor Zhongzong and then, covering the text of the edicts, ask him to sign them, and that he did so willingly. Also, many officials bribed her to be promoted to the emperor on her behalf or even to intercede for them to obtain the emperor's pardon for a sin she had committed. It seems that the taste of unlimited freedom, vast powers and the splendor of wealth increased her greed and arrogance, all because of her father's love and compassion. She also requested that she be made crown princess (huangtainü). Emperor Zhongzong, as advised by the senior chancellor Wei Yuanzhong, refused, and she, disappointed, replied rather irreverently:

Wei Yuanzhong is simply a stubborn man from east of the Taihang Mountains. What right does he have to comment on affairs of state? If that Wu woman [(i.e., Wu Zetian)] could become the Emperor, why cannot the daughter of the Emperor become an Emperor?

Despite this irreverence, Emperor Zhongzong did not rebuke her. He did, however, make her brother Li Chongjun, born of a concubine, crown prince. Both Li Guo'er and her husband Wu Chongxun looked down on Li Chongjun, however, and at times they even called him "slave". Emperor Zhongzong did nothing to stop his daughter's abuse of Li Chongjun, who was the crown prince. In summer 707, in anger, Li Chongjun rose in rebellion with the ethnically Mohe general Li Duozuo and Emperor Zhongzong's cousin Li Qianli (李千里) the Prince of Cheng. Li Chongjun killed Wu Sansi and Wu Chongxun, but in his subsequent attack on the palace was defeated and forced to flee; he was then killed in flight.

Emperor Zhongzong buried Wu Sansi and Wu Chongxun with great honor, creating Wu Chongxun the Prince of Lu posthumously. Li Guo'er wanted Wu Chongxun to be buried with honors due an emperor, and Emperor Zhongzong initially was inclined to agree, but after the official Lu Can (盧粲) advised against it, changed his mind—and Li Guo'er, in anger, had Lu demoted to be the prefect of Chen Prefecture (陳州, roughly modern Zhoukou, Henan).

Meanwhile, in the aftermaths of Li Chongjun's rebellion, Emperor Zhongzong had his alleged coconspirators investigated, at both Li Guo'er and the minister of defense Zong Chuke tried to implicate both Li Dan and Princess Taiping into the plot, but at the urging of the deputy minister of civil services and deputy imperial censor Xiao Zhizhong stopped the investigations into Li Dan and Princess Taiping. Li Guo'er actions worsened the conflict between her and her aunt, Princess Taiping, and became apparent in the eyes of Emperor Zhongzong.

By 708, Li Guo'er, her older sister Princess Changning, Empress Wei's sister the Lady of Cheng (郕), Consort Shangguan, Consort Shangguan's mother Lady Zheng (鄭), along with senior ladies in waiting of the families Chai (柴) and Helou (賀婁), the sorceress Diwu Ying'er (第五英兒), and Lady Zhao (趙) of Longxi (隴西), were all extremely powerful, influential and rich. It was said that Li Guo'er was particularly powerful and arrogant and that many officials, including chancellors, received offices because of her recommendations. She competed with Princess Changning in their extravagance, building mansions that were even more luxurious than imperial palaces. At one point, she asked Emperor Zhongzong to bestow on her the imperial pond Kunming Pond (昆明池)—a request Emperor Zhongzong denied on the account that many commoners fish at Kunming Pond to feed themselves. Li Guo'er, in anger, seized much private property to create a pond of her own, known as the Dingkun Pond (定昆池, i.e., "the pond that would compete with Kunming"), with many wondrous features that were intended to exceed those of Kunming Pond. She spent enormous amounts of money adorning her private pleasure park, having workers excavate a sixteen-mile circumference lake, dig out a river in the form of the milky way, and pile stones in the form of the sacred Mount Hua. Carpenters also made walkways and pavilions. After her death in 710, the government made the property a public place. She also built many Buddhist temples, as did her mother Empress Wei and sister Princess Changning.

In late 708, Li Guo'er remarried in a grand ceremony that included ceremonial guards that were only allowed for empresses, with Li Dan serving as the ceremonial commander. Also, her rival/aunt Princess Taiping, also danced at her wedding, and she gave her very precious wedding gifts. Her new husband was Wu Chongxun's cousin Wu Yanxiu (武延秀). The wedding banquet was set within the palace, and when Li Guo'er came out to greet the guests, they all bowed to her. Her young son by Wu Chongxun was only a few years old, but was created the Duke of Gao. On the occasion of his daughter's wedding, Emperor Zhongzong, in a move rarely done by emperors, ordered a general amnesty for the entire empire, inviting all the nobility to a three-day and night celebration, and ordering that the empire be exempt from taxes for several months.

In 709, two corrupt chancellors with connections to Li Guo'er, Cui Shi and Zheng Yin, were indicted by the assistant censors Jin Heng (靳恆), Li Shangyin, and Pei Cui (裴漼). Zheng was initially reduced to commoner rank and exiled, while Cui Shi was reduced in rank to military advisor to a prefectural prefect, but at the urging of Consort Shangguan, Li Guo'er, and Wu Yanxiu, their punishments were subsequently reduced.

== Death ==
In summer 710, Emperor Zhongzong died suddenly. Traditional historians assert that it was a poisoning (with the poison placed into a cake), carried out after a conspiracy by Empress Wei, her new lovers Ma Qinke (馬秦客) and Yang Jun (楊均), and Li Guo'er—with Li Guo'er's motive being that she hoped that Empress Wei would become "emperor" like her grandmother Wu Zetian and that she could become crown princess. After Emperor Zhongzong's death, Empress Wei placed his son (not by her) Li Chongmao the Prince of Wen on the throne (as Emperor Shang), but retained power herself as empress dowager and regent. Less than a month later, however, imperial guards, incited by Li Dan's son Li Longji the Prince of Linzi and Princess Taiping, attacked the palace. According to Zizhi Tongjian, during the attack, Li Guo'er was looking at herself in the mirror and putting on makeup when a soldier charged in and killed her. Also killed were Empress Dowager Wei, Wu Yanxiu, and Lady Helou. Subsequently, other members of the empress dowager's and Li Guo'er's factions were also killed.

Afterwards, at the urging of Princess Taiping, Li Longji, and Li Longji's elder brother Li Chengqi the Prince of Song, Li Dan took the throne again, displacing Emperor Shang. He posthumously reduced Empress Wei to commoner rank and reduced Li Guo'er further to the unusual rank of "rebellious commoner." However, he still buried her with honors due an official of the second rank. Her husband Wu Chongxun's grand tomb, however, was destroyed.
