= Cui Shi =

Chinese writer and politician

- 崔湜

Chancellor
- In office 709–713
- Monarch: Zhongzong

Cui Shi (Chinese: 崔湜; 671–713), courtesy name Chenglan (澄瀾), was a Chinese writer and politician. He served as an official of the Tang dynasty and Wu Zhou dynasty, serving as a chancellor during the reigns of Wu Zetian's sons Emperor Zhongzong and Emperor Ruizong and grandsons Emperor Shang and Emperor Xuanzong. In 713, with Emperor Xuanzong locked in a rivalry with his aunt Princess Taiping, Cui chose to side with Princess Taiping, and after Emperor Xuanzong suppressed Princess Taiping's party, Cui was exiled and ordered to commit suicide in exile.

== Life ==
=== Early life ===
Cui Shi was born in 671, during the reign of Emperor Gaozong. Cui Shi's grandfather Cui Renshi briefly served as a chancellor during the reign of Emperor Gaozong's father Emperor Taizong, and Cui Shi's father Cui Yi (崔挹) later served as the principal of the imperial university. Cui Shi himself was said to be literarily talented and ambitious in his youth. He passed the imperial examinations in his youth and was made Zuo Bujue (左補闕), a low level official at the examination bureau of government (鸞臺, Luantai). He participated in the editing of a work known as the Essence of Pearls from the Three Religions (三教珠英, Sanjiao Zhuying) — a compilation of various poetry about Confucianism, Buddhism, and Taoism—a project headed by Wu Zetian's lovers Zhang Yizhi and Zhang Changzong and the imperial scholar Li Jiao. After the work was complete, he was made Dianzhong Shi Yushi (殿中侍御史), a low level imperial censor.

=== Under Zhongzhong ===
In 705, Wu Zetian was overthrown in a coup, and her son and crown prince Li Xian, formerly emperor, was restored to the throne (as Emperor Zhongzong). Around this time, Cui Shi became Kaogong Yuanwai Lang (考功員外郎), a low level official at the ministry of civil service affairs. Upon Emperor Zhongzong's restoration, initially, five officials who were instrumental in the coup that overthrew Wu Zetian and restored him, Zhang Jianzhi, Cui Xuanwei, Huan Yanfan, Jing Hui, and Yuan Shuji, were powerful chancellors, but Emperor Zhongzong's cousin (Wu Zetian's nephew) Wu Sansi the Prince of Dejing, who was also the lover of Emperor Zhongzong's wife Empress Wei, soon became a trusted and powerful advisor to Emperor Zhongzong. Huan and Jing feared what machinations Wu Sansi might have, and so tried to make Cui Shi an associate and have him keep an eye on Wu Sansi, but Cui Shi, realizing that Emperor Zhongzong trusted Wu Sansi and not the coup leaders, instead revealed the coup leaders' plans to Wu Sansi. Subsequently, he became a strategist for Wu Sansi, and at Wu Sansi's recommendation was made Zhongshu Sheren (中書舍人), a mid-level official at the legislative bureau (中書省). The coup leaders were subsequently, after accusations by Wu Sansi, all exiled to the Lingnan region in 706 with provisions that they would never be allowed to return to the capital Chang'an. However, Cui Shi warned Wu Sansi that if somehow they returned to the capital later, they would create problems for him, and that they should somehow be killed in exile. Wu Sansi agreed, and at Cui Shi's recommendation, commissioned Cui Shi's cousin Zhou Lizhen (周利貞) to visit the Lingnan region, ostensibly to review the region, but with instructions to kill the five coup leaders. When Zhou reached the region, Zhang and Cui Xuanwei had already died, and Zhou had Huan, Jing, and Yuan killed cruelly.

Wu Sansi was killed in 707 in an unsuccessful coup by Emperor Zhongzong's crown prince Li Chongjun, and Cui Shi soon became closely associated with Emperor Zhongzong's powerful concubine Consort Shangguan Wan'er; traditional historians generally believed that they had an affair. In 708, he became the deputy minister of defense (兵部侍郎, Bingbu Shilang). (His father Cui Yi was then serving as the deputy minister of rites, and having father and son both serve as deputy ministers of one of the six departments of the executive bureau (尚書省, Shangshu Sheng) was unprecedented at that time.) In 709, at her recommendation, by which time Cui was Zhongshu Shilang (中書侍郎), the deputy head of the legislative bureau, Cui was given the designation Tong Zhongshu Menxia Pingzhangshi (同中書門下平章事), making him a chancellor de facto. He and fellow chancellor Zheng Yin were also made acting deputy ministers of civil service affairs (吏部侍郎, Libu Shilang), making them in charge of selecting officials, and it was said that both he and Zheng violated civil service regulations, accepted bribes, and promoted inappropriate persons. Further, his father Cui Yi was also accepting bribes and trying to influence Cui Shi, and when Cui Shi refused to follow Cui Yi's requests, the father-son relationship became a difficult one. (On one occasion, Cui Yi accepted a bribe from a reserve official hoping for a commission but forgot to tell Cui Shi about it, and Cui Shi did not grant that reserve official a commission. That reserve official went to see Cui Shi and asked him, "Your relative accepted my bribe. Why did I not get a commission?" Cui Shi angrily responded, "Who accepted the bribe? I will cane him to death!" The reserve official responded, "Do not do that! If you do that, you will have to observe a period of mourning." Cui realized that it was his father and became ashamed.) Later in 709, after indictment by the censors Jin Heng (靳恆) and Li Shangyin and investigation by the censor Pei Cui (裴漼), Cui and Zheng were removed from their offices. Cui was initially supposed to demoted to be the military advisor to the prefect of Jiang Prefecture (江州, roughly modern Jiujiang, Jiangxi), while Zheng was to be exiled to Ji Prefecture (吉州, roughly modern Ji'an, Jiangxi). After intercession by Consort Shangguan, as well as Emperor Zhongzong's daughter Li Guo'er the Princess Anle and Li Guo'er's husband Wu Yanxiu (武延秀), Cui was instead made the prefect of Xiang Prefecture (襄州, roughly modern Xiangfan, Hubei), and Zheng was made the military advisor to the prefect of Jiang Prefecture. However, later in the year, when Emperor Zhongzong was set to make sacrifices to heaven and earth south of Chang'an, he recalled both Cui and Zheng to attend to him during the ceremony, and Cui was soon made Shangshu Zuo Cheng (尚書左丞), one of the secretaries general of the executive bureau. Sometime during these years, Cui also suggested that a new canal should be built between Lantian (藍田, near Chang'an) and Shang Prefecture (商州, roughly modern Shangluo, Shaanxi), and Emperor Zhongzong agreed, putting Cui in charge of the project. The canal was built with some tens of thousands of conscripted laborers, and somewhere between 13 and 15 laborers died during the project. Cui would eventually be recognized for the project when the older canal that the new canal replaced became unnavigable after a serious summer storm. (Note: However, this account, contained in Cui's biography in the Old Book of Tang, may also be interpreted to read that it was the new canal that became unnavigable after the storm, and that was the interpretation that Cui's biography in the New Book of Tang took.)

=== Under Shang ===
In 710, Emperor Zhongzong died suddenly—a death that traditional historians believed to be a poisoning carried out by Empress Wei and Li Guo'er. His son by a concubine, Li Chongmao the Prince of Wen, was poised to be named emperor, but before Li Chongmao officially took the throne, Empress Wei carried out a number of official movements in order to consolidate her power, and as part of these moves, Cui, who was then Libu Shilang, was again made chancellor with the designation Tong Zhongshu Menxia Pingzhangshi. Li Chongmao soon took the throne (as Emperor Shang), but Empress Wei retained power as empress dowager and regent. Less than a month later, a coup led by Emperor Zhongzong's sister Princess Taiping and nephew Li Longji the Prince of Linzi killed Empress Wei and Li Guo'er. Li Longji's father Li Dan the Prince of Xiang, himself a former emperor, was made emperor (as Emperor Ruizong), displacing Emperor Shang, who was demoted back to being Prince of Wen.

=== Under Ruizong ===
After Emperor Ruizong took the throne, the chancellors commissioned by Empress Dowager Wei were generally demoted, and Cui Shi was demoted to be the prefect of Hua Prefecture (華州, roughly modern Weinan, Shaanxi). He was almost immediately recalled to serve again as deputy minister of civil service affairs and chancellor de facto, but later in the year was removed from that post and again became Shangshu Zuo Cheng. He was soon made Taizi Zhanshi (太子詹事), the head of household for Li Longji, who had been created crown prince by that point. He was further recognized for his role in building the new canal to Shang Prefecture, and was given the honorific title of Yinqing Guanglu Daifu (銀青光祿大夫). Meanwhile, another son of Emperor Zhongzong's, Li Chongfu the Prince of Qiao, had made an unsuccessful attempt to challenge Emperor Ruizong for the throne, and was killed. After Li Chongfu's death, Cui was accused of having improperly communicated with Li Chongfu while serving as prefect of Xiang Prefecture and receiving a golden belt from Li Chongfu—an offense that might subject him to execution, but Zhang Shuo and Liu Youqiu spoke on his behalf, and he was not punished.

Meanwhile, Princess Taiping and Li Longji struggled with each other in attempts to influence Emperor Ruizong's decisions that he consulted with both in important decisions, and the emperor often allowed both to be his spokesman to exercise power. They both sought Cui's support as well. Cui's brother Cui Di (崔滌) was a close associate of Li Longji's, and Li Longji visited Cui Shi's mansion several times, hoping to make him a close associate as well, but Cui, who eventually started an affair with Princess Taiping, became a member of her faction, and was said to have participated in her scheme to have Zhang removed from chancellorship. In 711, at her recommendation, he was again made Zhongshu Shilang and chancellor de facto, with the designation Tong Zhongshu Menxia Sanpin (同中書門下三品). (He admired fellow official Lu Xiangxian, who was not a member of Princess Taiping's faction. When Princess Taiping suggested that she would recommend him for chancellorship, he recommended Lu as well. She initially refused, but he stated that he would not dare to be chancellor unless Lu was promoted as well, and subsequently, she recommended both.)

=== Under Xuanzong ===
In 712, Emperor Ruizong passed the throne to Li Longji, who took the throne (as Emperor Xuanzong). Emperor Ruizong, however, retained actual power as Taishang Huang (retired emperor). Soon after Emperor Xuanzong's assumption of the throne, Cui Shi was made acting Zhongshu Ling (中書令), the head of the legislative bureau and a post considered one for a chancellor. Soon, there was a plan by Liu Yiuqiu, who was a close associate of Emperor Xuanzong's, and the general Zhang Wei (張暐), to kill several chancellors associated with Princess Taiping — Cui, Dou Huaizhen, and Cen Xi. However, the plan was leaked by the censor Deng Guangbin (鄧光賓), who was part of the plot. Emperor Xuanzong disavowed knowledge of the plan, and Liu, Zhang, and Deng were exiled. After Liu was exiled to Feng Prefecture (封州, roughly modern Zhaoqing, Guangdong), Cui gave instructions to Zhou Lizhen, who was then serving as the commandant at Guang Prefecture (廣州, roughly modern Guangzhou, Guangdong), under whose area of responsibility Feng Prefecture was, to have Liu killed. Liu's friend Wang Jun, who was then the commandant at Gui Prefecture (桂州, roughly modern Guilin, Guangxi), heard of this secret instruction, and therefore, when Liu went through Gui Prefecture, detained him and refused to let him go on to Feng Prefecture. Zhou submitted accusations that Wang was disobeying an imperial edict, and Cui repeatedly tried to pressure Wang to release Liu to Feng Prefecture. Liu himself pointed out to Wang that he did not want to put Wang in danger as well, but Wang refused to let Liu go on, and Liu was spared from death.

By 713, it was said that Princess Taiping, Dou, Cen, Xiao Zhizhong, Cui; along with other officials Xue Ji, Li Jin (李晉) the Prince of Xinxing (a grandson of Li Deliang (李德良), a cousin of Tang's founder Emperor Gaozu), Li You (李猷), Jia Yingfu (賈膺福), Tang Jun (唐晙); the generals Chang Yuankai (常元楷), Li Ci (李慈), and Li Qin (李欽); and the monk Huifan (惠範), They are all very powerful and influential, especially princess Taiping that was at the head of their leadership and seriously were plotting to overthrow Emperor Xuanzong. It was further said that they discussed, with the lady in waiting Lady Yuanto poison the gastrodia elata that Emperor Xuanzong routinely took as an aphrodisiac. When this alleged plot was reported to Emperor Xuanzong by Wei Zhigu, Emperor Xuanzong, who had already received advice from Wang Ju (王琚), Zhang Shuo, and Cui Riyong to act first, did so. He convened a meeting with his brothers Li Fan (李範) the Prince of Qi, Li Ye (李業) the Prince of Xue, Guo Yuanzhen, along with a number of his associates — the general Wang Maozhong (王毛仲), the officials Jiang Jiao (姜皎) and Li Lingwen (李令問), his brother-in-law Wang Shouyi (王守一), the eunuch Gao Lishi, and the military officer Li Shoude (李守德) — and decided to act first. On July 29, Emperor Xuanzong had Wang Maozhong take 300 soldiers to the imperial guard camp to behead Chang and Li Ci. Then, Jia, Li You, Xiao, and Cen were arrested and executed as well. Dou and Princess Taiping committed suicide. Emperor Ruizong yielded powers to Emperor Xuanzong and no longer actively participated in policy decisions thereafter.

Before Emperor Xuanzong acted, he again tried to make Cui a member of his own faction by summoning him to a private meeting. Before Cui went to the meeting, Cui Di warned him that he should switch to Emperor Xuanzong's side, but Cui Shi took no heed. After Princess Taiping's death, Cui Shi and another lover of Princess Taiping's, Lu Cangyong (盧藏用), were both exiled—in Cui's case, to Dou Prefecture (竇州, roughly modern Maoming, Guangdong). However, Cui believed that he would soon be recalled, and therefore progressed slowly. Meanwhile, after he left, Li Jin, at his execution, proclaimed, "This plan was Cui Shi's, not mine. Now I am dying, and Cui Shi lives. How is this right?" Further, when Lady Yuan was interrogated, she stated that Cui Shi was the one who planned to poison Emperor Xuanzong. Emperor Xuanzong therefore issued an edict ordering Cui Shi to commit suicide. The edict reached Cui at Jing Prefecture (荊州, roughly modern Jingzhou, Hubei), and he committed suicide there.

It was said that Cui Shi was famed for both his literary talent and physical attractiveness. His brothers Cui Ye (崔液) and Cui Di and cousin Cui Huai (崔淮) were also known for their talent. Whenever they had feasts among themselves, Cui Shi would compare his own household to the Wang and Xie clans of the Southern dynasties—highly honored clans that were honored for generations. He also stated, "My household and experience can be said to be the highest there could be. A man should control key positions so that he can control others; how can he let others control him?" It was said this principle governed Cui's actions and ultimately led him to destructive ambitions.
