= Zheng Yin (Early Tang) =

Zheng Yin (鄭愔) (died 710), courtesy name Wenjing (文靖), was an official of the Chinese Tang dynasty and Wu Zetian's Zhou dynasty, briefly serving as chancellor during the reign of Emperor Zhongzong.

== Background ==
Despite Zheng Yin's high status, little is firmly established about his career except for the 705 to 710 time period—as, unusual for a chancellor, he did not have a biography in either the Old Book of Tang or the New Book of Tang. It is known that he was not a member of the more prominent branches of the Zheng family that had served as officials since Northern Wei, but was from Cang Prefecture (滄州, roughly modern Cangzhou, Hebei). His father Zheng Xuansheng (鄭玄昇) served as a prefectural prefect. He passed the imperial examinations. It was said that during the reign of Wu Zetian, Zheng Yin was an associate of her lovers Zhang Yizhi and Zhang Changzong and had served as Dianzhong Shi Yushi (殿中侍御史), a low level imperial censor.

== During Emperor Zhongzong's second reign ==
In 705, Wu Zetian was overthrown in a coup, and her son and crown prince Li Xian, formerly emperor, was restored to the throne (as Emperor Zhongzong). Zhang Yizhi and Zhang Changzong were killed in the coup, and Zheng Yin, as their associate, was demoted to be publics works officer at Xuan Prefecture (宣州, roughly modern Xuancheng, Anhui). Once there, he was accused of receiving bribes, and he fled and secretly returned to the eastern capital Luoyang. Once at Luoyang, he secretly met Emperor Zhongzong's cousin (Wu Zetian's nephew) Wu Sansi the Prince of Liang, who was then a trusted advisor of Emperor Zhongzong and a lover to Emperor Zhongzong's powerful wife Empress Wei and was locked in a power struggle with the leaders of the coup that had returned Emperor Zhongzong to the throne—Zhang Jianzhi, Cui Xuanwei, Huan Yanfan, Jing Hui, and Yuan Shuji. When Zheng first saw Wu Sansi, he cried out loud, and then laughed out loud. Wu Sansi, who was stern in his disposition, was perplexed. Zheng responded:

When I first saw Your Highness, I was crying because Your Highness is about to be executed and your clan is about to be slaughtered. I then laughed, because Your Highness has met me. Although Your Highness pleases the will of the Son of Heaven, but the five of them wield power as generals and chancellors, and their boldness and strategies exceed the common men's. They easily deposed the Empress Dowager [i.e., Wu Zetian] as easily as they were flipping their palms. Your Highness should evaluate yourself—how comparable are your power and position compared to those of the Empress Dowager? The five of them are thrashing their teeth daily and want to eat your flesh, and they will not be satisfied until the entire Wu clan is slaughtered. If Your Highness cannot eliminate the five of them, your life will be like the dew in the morning, but you appear to feel that you are as secure as Mount Tai. This is why I am fearful for you.

Wu Sansi was very happy and invited Zheng up a tower, to further discuss with Zheng the strategies he should take. He further recommended Zheng to serve as Zhongshu Sheren (中書舍人), a mid-level official that legislative bureau of government (中書省, Zhongshu Sheng). Zheng thereafter served as chief strategist for Wu Sansi, along with Cui Shi. Soon, Wu Sansi and Empress Wei were able to persuade Emperor Zhongzong to remove the coup leaders from their chancellor posts under guise of honoring them with princely titles.

In 706, in association with Wu Sansi, Zheng accused the coup leaders, by then all out of the capital Chang'an, of having conspired with Emperor Zhongzong's son-in-law Wang Tongjiao (王同皎), who was executed early in 706 for having planned to kill Wu Sansi and depose Empress Wei. The five coup leaders were demoted to be military advisors to prefects in distant prefecture. Wu Sansi then had accusations about his affair with Empress Wei publicly posted in Luoyang, hoping to incense Emperor Zhongzong and then blame the coup leaders. Zheng then accused the coup leaders of having posted the accusations and requested that their clans be slaughtered. Emperor Zhongzong denied the request, but exiled the coup leaders to even more distant prefectures, where they subsequently died or were killed on Wu Sansi's orders.

In 707, Emperor Zhongzong's son by a concubine, Li Chongjun the Crown Prince, angry that Empress Wei's daughter Li Guo'er the Princess Anle and her husband Wu Chongxun (武崇訓, Wu Sansi's son) repeatedly humiliated him and were trying to have Li Guo'er made crown princess to displace him, rose in rebellion and killed Wu Sansi and Wu Chongxun, but subsequently was defeated and killed in exile. Zheng became an associate of Empress Wei's, and in 708, when he was serving as the minister of worship (太常卿, Taichang Qing), submitted an interpretation of popular songs that suggested that both Emperor Zhongzong and Empress Wei's authorities had divine origins, which pleased Emperor Zhongzong greatly.

In 709, Zheng was made the minister of civil service affairs (吏部尚書, Libu Shangshu), and given the designation of Tong Zhongshu Menxia Pingzhangshi (同中書門下平章事), making him a chancellor de facto. He, along with Cui, was in charge of selecting officials, and both of them were said to be corrupt. Later in 709, after indictment by the censors Jin Heng (靳恆) and Li Shangyin and investigation by the censor Pei Cui (裴漼), Cui and Zheng were removed from their offices. Cui was initially supposed to demoted to be the military advisor to the prefect of Jiang Prefecture (江州, roughly modern Jiujiang, Jiangxi), while Zheng was to be exiled to Ji Prefecture (吉州, roughly modern Ji'an, Jiangxi). After intercession by Emperor Zhongzong's concubine Consort Shangguan Wan'er, as well as Li Guo'er and Li Guo'er's new husband Wu Yanxiu (武延秀), Cui was instead made the prefect of Xiang Prefecture (襄州, roughly modern Xiangfan, Hubei), and Zheng was made the military advisor to the prefect of Jiang Prefecture. However, later in the year, when Emperor Zhongzong was set to make sacrifices to heaven and earth south of Chang'an, he recalled both Cui and Zheng to attend to him during the ceremony and apparently made deputy minister of civil service affairs (吏部侍郎, Libu Shilang).

== After Emperor Zhongzong's death ==
Emperor Zhongzong died suddenly in 710—a death that traditional historians believed to be a poisoning carried out by Empress Wei and Li Guo'er, so that Empress Wei could become "emperor" like Wu Zetian and Li Guo'er could become crown princess. For the time being, Emperor Zhongzong's son by another concubine, Li Chongmao the Prince of Wen, was made emperor (as Emperor Shang), and Empress Wei retained authority as empress dowager and regent. For reasons lost to history, she demoted Zheng Yin out of the capital, back to being the military advisor to the prefect of Jiang Prefecture. While he went through Jun Prefecture (均州, in modern Shiyan, Hubei), he secretly discussed with Emperor Zhongzong's son Li Chongfu the Prince of Qiao, the prefect of Jun Prefecture, whom Emperor Zhongzong had disfavored and exiled, and Zhang Lingjun (張靈均), about rising in rebellion against Empress Dowager Wei. Sometime thereafter, Zheng was recalled to the capital to serve as Mishu Shaojian (秘書少監), the deputy director of the Palace Library.

Less than a month after Emperor Zhongzong's death, a coup led by Emperor Zhongzong's sister Princess Taiping and nephew Li Longji the Prince of Linzi killed Empress Dowager Wei and Li Guo'er. Subsequently, Li Longji's father Li Dan the Prince of Xiang, himself a former emperor, returned to the throne (as Emperor Ruizong), displacing Emperor Shang. Zheng was demoted to be the prefect of Yuan Prefecture (沅州, roughly modern Huaihua, Hunan). He intentionally stopped over in Luoyang, knowing that Li Chongfu, under Zhang's instigation, would soon rebel. He prepared the mansion of Li Chongfu's brother-in-law Pei Sun (裴巽, the husband of LI Chongfu's sister Princess Yicheng), and also drafted two edicts—one purportedly from Emperor Zhongzong, ordering Li Chongfu to take the throne, and one for Li Chongfu, declaring himself emperor.

On September 9, 710, Li Chongfu arrived at Luoyang and took over Pei's mansion, and the officials at Luoyang, surprised, largely began to flee. Li Chongfu began to try to take command of the imperial troops in Luoyang, but the official Li Yong (李邕) persuaded the imperial guards to reject Li Chongfu, and when Li Chongfu arrived at imperial guards' camps, they fired arrows at him. His attacks on the governmental offices were also repelled. He thereafter fled and tried to hide, but the next day, with troops closing in on his position, he jumped into a canal and drowned. Zheng tried to flee by putting on women's clothes and changing his hair style into a woman's hairstyle, but was nevertheless captured. When both he and Zhang were interrogated, he was so fearful that he was shivering and unable to answer any questions. Zhang, who answered questions normally, commented as he looked on Zheng, "I deserve defeat for starting a rebellion with this kind of a man." Both Zheng and Zhang were taken to a busy marketplace and beheaded in public.

== Notes and references ==
- Zizhi Tongjian, vols. 208, 209, 210.
