= Li Chongfu =

- Prince Tangchang 唐昌王; Prince Pingen 平恩王; Prince Qiao 譙王
- Born: 680?
- Died: 10 September 710 (aged 30)
- Father: Emperor Zhongzong of Tang

Li Chongfu (李重福) (680? – September 10, 710) was an imperial prince of the Chinese Tang dynasty. He was a son of Emperor Zhongzong, but was not favored during Emperor Zhongzong's reign and was exiled. After Emperor Zhongzong's death in 710 and a subsequent coup by Li Chongfu's cousin Li Longji the Prince of Linzi and Li Chongfu's aunt Princess Taiping placed Li Longji's father Emperor Ruizong on the throne, Li Chongfu tried to rise against Emperor Ruizong, to claim the throne himself. But, he was quickly defeated, and he killed himself by drowning.

== During Emperor Gaozong's reign and the first reigns of Emperors Zhongzong and Ruizong ==
Li Chongfu was probably born in 680. His father Li Zhe was then crown prince under his grandfather Emperor Gaozong. His mother's name was not recorded in history, but it is known that he was not a son of Li Zhe's wife Crown Princess Wei. On 1 August 683, he was created the Prince of Tangchang. Later that year, when Emperor Gaozong became ill at the eastern capital Luoyang, he summoned Li Zhe from the capital Chang'an to Luoyang; in Li Zhe's absence, Li Chongfu might have been nominally in charge of Chang'an, but with the chancellor Liu Rengui actually in charge.

Emperor Gaozong died later in December 683. Li Zhe succeeded him (as Emperor Zhongzong), but Li Chongfu's grandmother Empress Wu wielded actual power as empress dowager. In spring 684, when Emperor Zhongzong displayed signs of independence, she deposed him and reduced him to the title of Prince of Luling, replacing him with his younger brother Li Dan the Prince of Yu (as Emperor Ruizong). Li Zhe was subsequently exiled to Jun Prefecture (均州, in modern Shiyan, Hubei). It is not known whether Li Chongfu followed his father into exile, nor whether he, like his brother Li Chongzhao, was reduced to commoner rank.

== During Wu Zetian's reign ==
In 690, Li Chongfu's grandmother Empress Dowager Wu forced his uncle Emperor Ruizong to yield the throne to her, interrupting Tang dynasty and establishing her own Zhou dynasty with her as "emperor" (thereafter known as Wu Zetian). In 698, under the advice of the chancellor Di Renjie, she recalled Li Zhe to Luoyang, which had been made capital. Soon thereafter, Li Dan, who had been made crown prince when he yielded the throne, offered to yield the position of crown prince to Li Zhe. Wu Zetian agreed, and created Li Zhe crown prince, changing his personal name to Xian and further changing his surname to Wu. In 700, Li Chongfu was created the Prince of Ping'en.

In 701, Li Chongfu's brother Li Chongzhao (who had, by this point, changed his name to Li Chongrun to observe naming taboo of Wu Zetian's name), along with their sister Li Xianhui the Lady Yongtai and Li Xianhui's husband Wu Yanji (武延基) the Prince of Wei (Wu Zetian's grandnephew), were put to death for criticizing Wu Zetian's lovers Zhang Yizhi and Zhang Changzong. Whether Li Chongfu was responsible for leaking their criticism to the Zhangs and therefore leading to Li Chongrun's death is not known. Li Chongrun's mother Crown Princess Wei, after she later became empress again, would later accuse Li Chongfu of leaking the information, although there appears to be no particular evidence Li Chongfu did so, and in the Zizhi Tongjian, it was asserted that her accusation against Li Chongfu was false.

In 704, Wu Zetian created Li Chongfu the greater title of Prince of Qiao.

== During Emperor Zhongzong's second reign ==
In 705, a coup removed Wu Zetian from power and restored Emperor Zhongzong to the throne. Emperor Zhongzong's wife Crown Princess Wei was again empress. It was said that she despised Li Chongfu, particularly because his wife was a niece of Zhang Yizhi and Zhang Changzong. She therefore accused Li Chongfu of being involved in Li Chongzhao's death. In response, Emperor Zhongzong first exiled Li Chongfu out of the capital to serve as the prefect of Pu Prefecture (濮州, roughly modern Heze, Shandong), but did not allow him to actually exercise prefect powers. He was later further exiled to be the prefect of Jun Prefecture, under the same conditions. Emperor Zhongzong also ordered that the prefectural governmental officials keep close watch on Li Chongfu.

During Emperor Zhongzong's reign, he had often issued pardons, and the exiled persons were generally all allowed to return to the capital. However, Li Chongfu was not, and lamenting the situation, he wrote a petition to Emperor Zhongzong in 709, stating:

Your Imperial Majesty has been burning fragrant wood to personally perform grand ceremonies -- to worship Heaven south of the capital. As a result, you pardoned the ordinary citizens. However, your son was excluded from the pardon. How is this fairness? When the people heard that I was not pardoned, they mourn and cry for me. Your Imperial Majesty is kind, and why would you not be merciful toward your sad and fearful son?

The petition, however, was ignored.

== Death ==
In 710, Emperor Zhongzong died suddenly—a death that traditional historians assert was a poisoning at the direction of Empress Wei and her daughter Li Guo'er the Princess Anle, who wanted to be crown princess. Empress Wei took power as empress dowager while putting Li Chongfu's younger brother Li Chongmao the Prince of Wen on the throne (as Emperor Shang). She dispatched imperial guards to Jun Prefectures to watch Li Chongfu closely. Less than a month later, however, a coup headed by Li Chongfu's cousin Li Longji the Prince of Linzi (Li Dan's son) and Li Chongfu's aunt Princess Taiping overthrew and killed Empress Dowager Wei. Li Dan became regent and issued an order trying to comfort Li Chongfu. Shortly thereafter, Emperor Shang was deposed, and Li Dan took the throne again as Emperor Ruizong. Emperor Ruizong promoted Li Chongfu to be the prefect of Ji Prefecture (集州, roughly modern Bazhong, Sichuan).

Meanwhile, though, Li Chongfu's guest, the official Zheng Yin, who had been demoted by Emperor Zhongzong in 709 and had been passing through Jun Prefecture, prior to the coup, had been planning to rise in rebellion against Empress Dowager Wei with Li Chongfu and Zhang Lingjun (張靈均). Li Chongfu had not yet departed for Ji Prefecture when Zhang persuaded him that, as Emperor Zhongzong's oldest surviving son, he was entitled to the throne and that Emperor Ruizong was not. Zhang proposed that he make a surprise entry into Luoyang and try to seize the imperial troops there, and then take those troops west to attack Emperor Ruizong.

After Li Chongfu's plans were set, Zheng, who had been recalled to Chang'an but then redemoted again to be the prefect of Yuan Prefecture (沅州, roughly modern Huaihua, Hunan), intentionally stopped in Luoyang to wait for Li Chongfu. He also drafted several edicts for Li Chongfu, including one in Emperor Zhongzong's name ordering that Li Chongfu be given the throne, and one in Li Chongfu's name accepting the throne. On September 9, 710, Li Chongfu arrived at Luoyang and took over the mansion of his brother-in-law Pei Sun (裴巽), and the officials at Luoyang, surprised, largely began to flee. Li Chongfu began to try to take command of the imperial troops in Luoyang, but the official Li Yong (李邕) persuaded the imperial guards to reject Li Chongfu, and when Li Chongfu arrived at imperial guards' camps, they fired arrows at him. His attacks on the governmental offices were also repelled. He thereafter fled and tried to hide, but the next day, with troops closing in on his position, he jumped into a canal and drowned. Emperor Ruizong reduced him to commoner rank but buried him with ceremony due an official of the third rank.

== Notes and references ==
- Old Book of Tang, vol.86.
- New Book of Tang, vol.81.
- Zizhi Tongjian, vols. 203, 207, 208, 209, 210.
