= Yu Weiqian =

Yu Weiqian (于惟謙) was an official of the Chinese Tang dynasty, briefly serving as chancellor during the reign of Emperor Zhongzong.

Despite Yu's high status, little is firmly established about his career except for the time that he served as chancellor—as, unusual for a chancellor, he did not have a biography in either the Old Book of Tang or the New Book of Tang. and he not even listed in the family tree of chancellors named Yu.

As of 706, Yu was serving as Zhongshu Shilang (中書侍郎), the deputy head of the legislative bureau of government (中書省, Zhongshu Sheng), when he was given the designation Tong Zhongshu Menxia Pingzhangshi (同中書門下平章事), making him a chancellor de facto. In 707, he was removed as chancellor and made the principal of the imperial university (國子祭酒, Guozi Jijiu). That was the last historical record regarding Yu, and it is not known when he died.

According to the Old Book of Tang, by the time Yu was removed as chancellor, he had already been created Duke of Donghai.

== Notes and references ==
- Zizhi Tongjian, vol. 208.
