= Li Jiao =

Li Jiao may refer to:

- Li Jiao (Tang Dynasty), official of the Chinese Tang Dynasty
- Li Jiao (table tennis) (born 1973), Chinese-born table tennis player
