= Wu Sansi =

Politician of Tang and Wu Zhou dynasties (died 707)

- Died: 7 August 707
- Issue: Wu Chongxun
Names
- Family name: Wu (武); Given name: Sansi (三思) Titles Prince Liang梁王; Prince Dejing 德靜王
Posthumous name
- Xuan 宣
- Father: Wu Yuanqing

Wu Sansi (died August 7, 707), known posthumously as Prince Xuan of Liang (梁宣王), was a Chinese prince and politician of the Tang and Wu Zhou dynasties. Wu Sansi served as a chancellor and imperial prince during the reign of his aunt, Empress Wu Zetian of Zhou, and was again a powerful chancellor during the second reign of Empress Wu's son, Emperor Zhongzong of Tang. He was aided in navigating the fraught period that followed Emperor Zhongzong's restoration by successive affairs with the influential consort Shangguan Wan'er and the powerful Empress Wei. Although he amassed significant authority and enjoyed the trust of Emperor Zhongzong, he was killed during an unsuccessful rebellion by the crown prince Li Chongjun in 707.

== Background ==
It is not known when Wu Sansi was born. His father Wu Yuanqing (武元慶) was a half-brother of Wu Zetian—both had, as father, the early Tang dynasty general Wu Shihuo (武士彠), but Wu Yuanqing and his brother Wu Yuanshuang (武元爽) were born of Wu Shihuo's first wife Lady Xiangli, while Wu Zetian and her two sisters were born of Wu Shihuo's second wife Lady Yang. After Wu Zetian became empress to Emperor Gaozong in 655, despite previous intrafamily unpleasantries—Wu Yuanqing and Wu Yuanshuang, as well as Wu Shihuo's nephews Wu Weiliang (武惟良) and Wu Huaiyun (武懷運) were often disrespectful of Lady Yang previously—Empress Wu's brothers and cousins were often promoted by Emperor Gaozong, with Wu Yuanqing promoted to Zongzheng Shaoqing (宗正少卿), the deputy minister of imperial clan affairs. As the years passed, more and more power passed to Empress Wu, who until 665 had complete control of power, which was the beginning of her ascension to the imperial throne, which made his family increasingly in the highest honorable in among the powerful families of the empire. However, sometime before 666, Empress Wu, angry that her brothers and cousins did not appreciate the promotions, had them all demoted, with Wu Yuanqing demoted to be the prefect of Long Prefecture (龍州, roughly modern Mianyang, Sichuan). After he arrived at Long Prefecture, he, in fear that Empress Wu had further retaliation in the works, died. It is not completely clear, but it was likely that Wu Sansi went to Long Prefecture with his father Wu Yuanqing. In 675, at the behest of Empress Wu, Wu's family was pardoned and Wu Sansi was hailed as the empress's nephew, and he was made a commanding general of the imperial guards.

== During Empress dowager Wu's regency ==
Emperor Gaozong died in 683, and was initially succeeded by his and Empress Wu's son Li Zhe the Crown Prince (as Emperor Zhongzong), but Empress Wu retained power as empress dowager and regent. In spring 684, after Emperor Zhongzong showed signs of independence, she deposed him and replaced him with another son, Li Dan the Prince of Yu, but wielded power even more tightly thereafter. Sometime during her regency, Wu Sansi became minister of defense (夏官尚書, Xiaguan Shangshu). Both he and his cousin Wu Chengsi (Wu Yuanshuang's son) advised Empress Dowager Wu to find excuses to kill two senior members of the imperial Li clan—Emperor Gaozong's uncles Li Yuanjia (李元嘉) the Prince of Han and Li Lingkui (李靈夔) the Prince of Lu due to their senior status. (Eventually, after two other princes—Emperor Gaozong's brother Li Zhen the Prince of Yue and Li Zhen's son Li Chong the Prince of Langye unsuccessfully rose against Empress Dowager Wu in 688, Empress Dowager Wu took the opportunity to also force Li Yuanjia and Li Lingkui, as well as many other members of the Li clan, to commit suicide or to execute them.) Wu Sansi and Wu Chengsi were also said to be often advocating that Empress Dowager Wu take over the throne herself as "emperor."

== During Wu Zetian's reign ==
In 690, Empress Dowager Wu had Emperor Ruizong yield the throne to her, and she took the throne as "emperor," establishing a new Zhou dynasty and interrupting Tang. She created a number of her Wu clan relatives imperial princes, and Wu Sansi was created the Prince of Liang and made the minister of civil service affairs (天官尚書, Tianguan Shangshu). He did not appear to have as much power as Wu Chengsi (who became chancellor), but was nevertheless honored. For example, in 693, when Wu Zetian made sacrifices to heaven and earth, she offered the sacrifices herself first, followed by Wu Chengsi, and then Wu Sansi. It was said that he had done some studies in literature and history and was good at flattery. As the years went by, he often flattered Wu Zetian's successive lovers Huaiyi, Zhang Yizhi, and Zhang Changzong.

In 694, Wu Sansi led a group of non-Han chieftains in requesting that a massive iron pillar be erected to commemorate Wu Zetian's reign with text on it to deprecate Tang and to praise Zhou, and Wu Zetian agreed, putting the chancellor Yao Shu in charge of the project. It was said that the chieftains gathered up their wealth and bought iron, but the iron they bought was not enough, and so the people's farm equipment were requisitioned and melted for the project.

In 695, Wu Sansi was made the Minister of Rites and was put in charge of editing the imperial history.

In 696, when Khitan attacked under the leadership of Li Jinzhong and Sun Wanrong, Wu Sansi was put in command of one of the major armies defending against the Khitan attack, assisted by Yao.

In 697, Wu Sansi was given the designation Tong Fengge Luantai Sanpin (同鳳閣鸞臺三品), making him a chancellor de facto, but about a month later, he was stripped of the chancellor designation. It was said that he and Wu Chengsi both had designs on being crown prince, and often had their associates try to persuade Wu Zetian that in ages past, there had never been an emperor who had, as his heir, someone with a different family name. (At that time, Wu Zetian's crown prince was her son Li Dan (the former Emperor Ruizong).) In 698, however, at the suggestion of the chancellor Di Renjie, concurred in by Wang Jishan and Wang Fangqing, as well as Wu Zetian's close advisor Ji Xu and her lovers Zhang Yizhi and Zhang Changzong, Wu Zetian recalled Li Zhe the Prince of Luling (the former Emperor Zhongzong) from exile and soon, after Li Dan offered to yield the position of crown prince to him, created him crown prince and changed his name to Li Xian and then to Wu Xian.

In 698, Wu Zetian made Wu Sansi acting Neishi (內史), the head of the legislative bureau of government (鳳閣, Fengge); the next year, he was made full Neishi. In 700, however, he was no longer chancellor and was made an advisor to Li Xian. He received the honorific title of Tejin (特進).

In 702, Wu Zetian considered launching a major attack against Eastern Tujue and she initially put Wu Sansi in command, assisted by Jing Hui. She later changed the orders to have Li Dan in command, assisted by Wu Sansi, his cousin Wu Youning the prince of Jiancheng, and the chancellor Wei Yuanzhong. However, the army was eventually not launched.

In 704, at Wu Sansi's suggestion, Wu Zetian constructed the vacation palace Xingtai (興泰宮) at Mount Wan'an (萬安山, near the capital Luoyang), at much expense and labor.

== During Emperor Zhongzong's second reign ==
Wu Zetian was overthrown in a coup (Shenlong Coup) in 705 led by the officials Zhang Jianzhi, Cui Xuanwei, Jing Hui, Huan Yanfan, and Yuan Shuji. Zhang Yizhi and Zhang Changzong were killed in the coup, and Emperor Zhongzong was restored to the throne; Wu Zetian was sent to a secondary palace under heavy guard, and while she also retained the title of "emperor," no longer had power. By that time, Wu Sansi had been carrying out an affair with Wu Zetian's secretary and Emperor Zhongzong's concubine Consort Shangguan Wan'er. Through her introduction, Wu Sansi began an affair with Emperor Zhongzong's wife Empress Wei as well and also became a trusted advisor to Emperor Zhongzong who, while he was restored through the efforts of Zhang Jianzhi and his colleagues, feared them. In addition, Wu Sansi's son Wu Chongxun ((武崇訓) had been married to Emperor Zhongzong's and Empress Wei's daughter Li Guo'er the Princess Anle, who also had much power in her father's administration and had influence over her father and it is said that she used this power and influence in a corrupt manner and because of this, she gained a lot of wealth and had an extravagant luxurious and luxury life.

Meanwhile, the coup leaders initially did not regard Wu Sansi as a threat, and they brushed aside suggestions by two lower level officials participating in the coup, Xue Jichang (薛季昶) and Liu Youqiu. However, they soon realized that Wu Sansi's power was on the rise, and they unsuccessfully suggested Emperor Zhongzong to kill some of the more powerful Wu clan members (which would have included Wu Sansi) or to demote them—and indeed, he made Wu Sansi Sikong (司空, one of the Three Excellencies) and chancellor again with the designation Tong Zhongshu Menxia Sanpin (同中書門下三品, a modification of the Tong Fengge Luantai Sanpin designation that Wu Zetian used), although Wu Sansi declined the titles. Meanwhile, Emperor Zhongzong designated 16 officials, including the coup leaders but also Wu Sansi and his cousin Wu Youji (the husband of Emperor Zhongzong's sister Princess Taiping), as contributors to his return to the throne and gave them iron certificates that were supposed to guarantee that they would be spared of death penalties 10 times except for treason.

Jing, fearful of Wu Sansi's power, retained the mid-level official Cui Shi to watch for Wu Sansi's moves—but Cui Shi, realizing that Emperor Zhongzong trusted Wu Sansi and feared the coup leaders, instead became Wu Sansi's associate, along with Zheng Yin, who suggested that Wu Sansi find some way to remove the five coup leaders, now all chancellors, from their posts. Wu Sansi and Empress Wei, in turn, argued to Emperor Zhongzong that the five coup leaders were overpowering in the government and should be given honorific titles but be removed from office. At their suggestion, Emperor Zhongzong created the five coup leaders princes and awarded them much wealth, but removed them from governmental posts, including chancellor positions—and soon sent Zhang Jianzhi and Cui Xuanwei out of the capital. Wu Sansi, now in power, had much of Wu Zetian's policies, which the five coup leaders had reversed, reinstated. Meanwhile, to diffuse some of the popular sentiment against the Wu clan, Emperor Zhongzong demoted their titles slightly, and Wu Sansi's title was reduced from Prince of Liang to the lesser title of Prince of Dejing. As Emperor Zhongzong also trusted Wei Yuanzhong (whom Wu Zetian had exiled in 703 but whom Emperor Zhongzong recalled upon his restoration to the throne), when Wu Zetian died in late 705, Wu Sansi tried to ingratiate Wei by writing into Wu Zetian's will a provision giving Wei an additional fief of 100 households. Wei, in gratitude, did not oppose the Wu clan further from that point.

In spring 706, Wu Sansi, fearful that Jing, Huan, and Yuan were still in the capital, sent them out of the capital to serve as prefectural prefects. Meanwhile, an incident occurred that allowed Wu Sansi to act further against the five coup leaders—as Emperor Zhongzong's son-in-law Wang Tongjiao (王同皎), himself a participant in the coup, was accused of plotting with Zhang Zhongzhi (張仲之), Zu Yanqing (祖延慶), and Zhou Jing (周璟) to kill Wu Sansi and deposing Empress Wei. The alleged plotters were all killed, and Wu Sansi and Empress Wei thereafter accused the five coup leaders of having been part of Wang Tongjiao's plot, and the five were demoted further, to more distant prefecture, with no possibility of return from exile. Meanwhile, Wu Sansi, knowing that Emperor Zhongzong was very sensitive about any accusation of adultery by Empress Wei, intentionally had people post public accusations that she had been involved in adultery—and then framed the five coup leaders of doing so, and the five coup leaders, already in exile, were stripped of all of their titles and honors. Wu Sansi, at Cui Shi's suggestion, then sent the secret police official Zhou Lizhen (周利貞) to the Lingnan region, where the five had been exiled, to survey the area, but with instructions to have the five killed. When Zhou reached Lingnan, Zhang Jianzhi and Cui Xuanwei had already died, but he killed Huan, Jing, and Yuan in cruel manners. It was said that after news of the five coup leaders' deaths reached Wu Sansi, he commented, "I do not know who are good people and who are bad people on this earth. I only know that people who are good to me are good, and people who are bad to me are bad."

In spring 707, with an ongoing drought, Emperor Zhongzong sent Wu Sansi and Wu Youji to Emperor Gaozong's and Wu Zetian's tomb to pray for rain, and when rain came, Emperor Zhongzong restored Wu Zetian's ancestral temple to near-imperial ancestral temple status.

Meanwhile, Emperor Zhongzong had created his son Li Chongjun, by a concubine, crown prince, as Empress Wei's only son Li Chongrun had been killed by Wu Zetian in 701, but Li Guo'er, encouraged by Wu Chongxun, had designs on becoming crown princess, and repeatedly asked Emperor Zhongzong to make her crown princess. Both she and Wu Chongxun also repeatedly insulted Li Chongjun, sometimes calling him "slave." In fall 707, Li Chongjun, in anger, started a rebellion with the generals Li Duozuo, Li Sichong (李思沖), Li Chengkuang (李承況), Dugu Yizhi (獨孤禕之), and Shazha Zhongyi (沙吒忠義), as well as Emperor Zhongzong's cousin Li Qianli (李千里) the Prince of Cheng and Li Qianli's son Li Xi (李禧) the Prince of Tianshui. They attacked Wu Sansi's mansion and killed Wu Sansi, Wu Chongxun, and some of their relatives. Li Chongjun's subsequent attempt to reach the palace and arrest Consort Shangguan, Empress Wei, and Li Guo'er, however, were unsuccessful, and his troops collapsed; he was killed. Li Chongjun was beheaded, and his head was presented to Wu Sansi's and Wu Chongxun's caskets. Wu Sansi and Wu Chongxun were buried in grand funerals, and Wu Sansi was posthumously recreated the Prince of Liang with the posthumous name of Xuan (宣, "responsible"). After Emperor Zhongzong's death in 710, a coup led by Princess Taiping and Li Dan's son Li Longji the Prince of Linzi overthrew Empress Wei and restored Emperor Ruizong to the throne, and Wu Sansi's tomb was destroyed.

== In fiction and popular culture ==
- One of the protagonists in the Ming dynasty erotic novel Su'e pian.
- Portrayed by Eric Li in The Greatness of a Hero (2009).

== See also ==
- Prince of Liang
