= Emperor Zhongzong of Tang =

Emperor of Tang China (684, 705–710)

Emperor Zhongzong of Tang 唐中宗
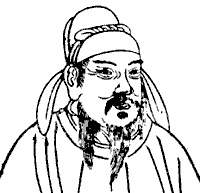

Emperor of the Tang dynasty
- Reign: 3 January 684 – 26 February 684
- Predecessor: Emperor Gaozong (under Empress Zetian's shadow)
- Successor: Emperor Ruizong (under Empress Zetian's regency)
- Regent: Empress Zetian
- Reign: 23 February 705 – 3 July 710
- Predecessor: Dynasty restored (Wu Zetian as empress regnant of the Wu Zhou dynasty)
- Successor: Emperor Shang (under Empress Wei's regency)
- De facto regent: Empress Wei
- Born: 26 November 656; Chang'an
- Died: 3 July 710 (aged 53)
- Burial: Ding Mausoleum (定陵)
- Consorts: Empress Hesi (died 675); Lady Wei of Jingzhao (m. –710)
- Issue: Li Chongrun; Li Chongfu; Li Chongjun; Emperor Shang; Princess Changning; Princess Yongtai; Princess Anle
Names
- Family name: Li (李), later Wu (changed 700), later back to Li (changed 705); Given name: Xian (顯), later Zhe (哲), (Note: His name was changed into "Zhe" in 677.) then later back to Xian (顯) (Note: His name reverted to Xian when he was reinstated as crown prince in October 698. This name became his taboo name when he regained the throne in 705.)
Posthumous name
- Short: Emperor Xiaohe (孝和皇帝); Full: Emperor Dahe Dasheng; Dazhao Xiao (Note: Final version of his posthumous name as given in 754.) (大和大聖大昭孝皇帝)
Temple name
- Zhōngzōng (中宗)
- House: Li
- Dynasty: Tang
- Father: Emperor Gaozong
- Mother: Empress Zetian

Tang Zhongzong
- Chinese: 唐中宗
- Literal meaning: "Middle Ancestor of the Tang"
Transcriptions
Standard Mandarin
- Hanyu Pinyin: Táng Zhōngzōng
Yue: Cantonese
- Yale Romanization: Tòhng Jungjūng

Li Xian
- Chinese: 李顯
Transcriptions
Standard Mandarin
- Hanyu Pinyin: Lǐ Xiǎn
Yue: Cantonese
- Yale Romanization: Léih Hín

Li Zhe
- Chinese: 李哲
Transcriptions
Standard Mandarin
- Hanyu Pinyin: Lǐ Zhé
Yue: Cantonese
- Yale Romanization: Léih Jit

Wu Xian
- Chinese: 武顯
Transcriptions
Standard Mandarin
- Hanyu Pinyin: Wǔ Xiǎn
Yue: Cantonese
- Yale Romanization: Móuh Hín

Emperor Zhongzong of Tang (26 November 656 – 3 July 710), personal name Li Xian, and at other times Li Zhe or Wu Xian, was the fourth and sixth emperor of the Tang dynasty of China, ruling briefly in 684 and again from 705 until his death in 710. During the first period, he did not have actual power, which was in the hands of his mother Empress Wu Zetian, and he was overthrown on her orders after opposing his mother. During his second reign, most of the power was in the hands of his consort Empress Wei.

Emperor Zhongzong was the son of Emperor Gaozong of Tang and Empress Wu (later known as Wu Zetian), and during the reign of his father, Emperor Zhongzong's mother Empress Wu, not Emperor Gaozong, was in actual control of power as empress consort and power behind the emperor. He succeeded his father in 684, But as emperor, he had no true power, and all authority remained in the firm hands of his mother, Empress Dowager Wu. His mother, however, deposed him less than two months later in favor of his younger brother Emperor Ruizong. The former emperor, demoted to a princely rank, was exiled to the provinces and placed under house arrest. Six years later, Emperor Ruizong relinquished the throne to his mother and Empress Dowager Wu officially proclaimed herself empress regnant, while Emperor Ruizong was made crown prince.

By 698, the court was caught in the middle of a bitter power struggle. In an attempt to secure her prominence, Empress Wu liberated the former emperor from his 14 years of seclusion and recalled him to the capital in April 698. He was reinstated as crown prince in October 698, taking his brother's place. On 20 February 705, a palace coup (Shenlong Coup) deposed Wu Zetian and Emperor Zhongzong was restored as emperor three days later. Emperor Zhongzong reigned for five years but was a totally weak, carefree, cowardly, shy, henpecked weakling and easily influenced ruler. Thus, real power was in the hands of his empress consort, Empress Wei and her lover Wu Sansi (Wu Zetian's nephew) and his daughter Li Guo'er, the Princess Anle. He was relatively similar to his father. Of course, Emperor Gaozong was able to make decisions, although he did it slowly in government affairs, but various debilitating diseases until his death became the main reason for handing over power to his wife Empress Wu. In contrast, Emperor Zhongzong likely had depression due to his long duration under house arrest; this encouraged him to hand over power to his wife and daughter.

In 710, Emperor Zhongzong died, allegedly poisoned by Empress Wei, who then installed his son, Li Chongmao, as Emperor Shang. Empress Wei, who had failed to install her daughter Li Guo'er, the Princess Anle, as heir to Emperor Zhongzong, thought that Li Chongmao, born of Zhongzong and a concubine and who was only 16 years old, would be easy to control and allow her to preserve her power. The scheme failed, however, when Princess Taiping, the sister of Emperor Zhongzong, launched a coup two weeks later with her nephew Li Longji (later Emperor Xuanzong), son of the abdicated Emperor Ruizong, and overthrew Empress Wei and the young emperor. Emperor Ruizong, the father of Li Longji and the older brother of Princess Taiping, was restored as emperor.

== Background ==
Li Xiǎn (Note: Tonal signs for his original name are used in this section only to disambiguate between him and his brother Li Xián.) was born in 656, as the seventh son of his father Emperor Gaozong and the third son of his mother, Emperor Gaozong's second wife Empress Wu (later known as Wu Zetian). In 657, he was created the Prince of Zhou and nominally made the prefect of the eastern capital prefecture Luo Prefecture (洛州, roughly modern Luoyang, Henan). In 661, when his older brother Li Xián the Prince of Pei had the literarily-talented official Wang Bo on staff, the princes were apparently often engaged in cockfighting. Wang Bo wrote a playful piece entitled the Declaration Against the Prince of Zhou's Cock (檄周王雞文), which, however, when Emperor Gaozong read it, caused Emperor Gaozong to be angry, as he believed this would cause discord between his sons, and therefore expelled Wang from the Pei mansion. However, in 674, a similar incident happened by Emperor Gaozong's own instigation—as, at an imperial feast, he divided the imperial musicians into two teams and had Li Xián and Li Xiǎn lead the two teams in competition—although he stopped when the chancellor Hao Chujun pointed out the potential for rivalry.

Meanwhile, during the years that Li Xiǎn was the Prince of Zhou, he had married a daughter of his grandaunt the Princess Changle and her husband, the general Zhao Gui (趙瓌), as his wife and princess. Emperor Gaozong had often shown favors to Princess Changle, and this displeased Empress Wu. In 675, on account of this, she had Princess Zhao accused of crimes and put into solitary confinement at the bureau of eunuchs. She was given raw vegetables and raw meat for her to cook them herself. However, sometime later, the kitchen stopped to have smoke and steam come out of it, and when Empress Wu had her confinement house opened, Princess Zhao was seen dead inside, having starved to death. Empress Wu also demoted Zhao Gui to be the prefect of Kuo Prefecture (括州, roughly modern Lishui, Zhejiang) and ordered Princess Changle to accompany her husband to Kuo Prefecture, and further ordered that neither Zhao Gui nor Princess Changle would be allowed to enter the palace.

In 676, when the Tibetan Empire attacked Tang's western prefectures, Li Xiǎn and his younger brother Li Lun, the Prince of Xiang, were nominally put in charge of the two armies that were actually commanded by the generals Liu Shenli (劉審禮) and Qibi Heli (契苾何力), but neither Li Xiǎn nor Li Lun actually set out with the troops.

In 677, Li Xiǎn had his title changed to Prince of Ying. His name was also changed to Li Zhe. He was also made the prefect of the capital prefecture Yong Prefecture (雍州, roughly modern Xi'an, Shaanxi).

By 680, Li Xián, who was then crown prince, had lost Empress Wu's favor. After she suspected him of having had her trusted sorcerer Ming Chongyan (明崇儼) assassinated, she had him investigated for treason, and subsequently, he was found guilty. He was reduced to commoner rank and exiled, and Li Zhe was created crown prince to replace him. Hao Chujun and another chancellor, Liu Rengui, were made his senior advisors. Emperor Gaozong also recruited the famed hermit scholar Tian Youyan (田遊巖) to serve as an advisor, although Tian would later draw criticism from others for not having any actual good advice for the crown prince.

== First stint as crown prince ==
In 681, after Emperor Gaozong had become ill after consuming pills made by alchemists, Empress Wu rarely allowed anyone to meet with Emperor Gaozong, and all important matters were resolved in the Central Palace (the residence of the empresses), he had Li Zhe briefly exercise imperial powers, also, the chancellors aligned with Empress Wu were also responsible for helping him.

In 682, Li Zhe's second wife, Crown Princess Wei, gave birth to a son, Li Chongzhao. Emperor Gaozong was pleased, and he created Li Chongzhao the unprecedented title of "Deputy Crown Prince" (皇太孫, Huang Taisun). Later that year, due to a famine in the Guanzhong region (i.e., the region around the capital Chang'an), Emperor Gaozong took up residence at the eastern capital Luoyang, leaving Li Zhe in charge of Chang'an, assisted by the chancellors Liu Rengui, Pei Yan, and Xue Yuanchao. it was said that while Li Zhe was in charge of Chang'an, he often spent his time on games and hunting, and Xue often advised him against spending time in this manner. When Emperor Gaozong heard this, he rewarded Xue and summoned Xue to Luoyang.

In 683, Emperor Gaozong became ill at Luoyang, and he summoned Li Zhe to Luoyang, leaving Li Chongrun nominally in charge of Chang'an, assisted by Liu. After Li Zhe arrived at Luoyang, Emperor Gaozong transferred imperial powers to him (probably on the advice of Empress Wu), and soon died. Li Zhe took the throne (as Emperor Zhongzong), but actual powers were entire in the hands of Empress Wu, now empress dowager and regent.

== First reign: under Empress Dowager Wu's regency and dethronement ==
After the death of Emperor Gaozong, Emperor Zhongzong ascended the throne, leaving a will on his deathbed which stated:

After 7 days, the Crown Prince will sit on the throne in front of my coffin. In the case of the tomb regime, austerity policies must be maintained, and the chancellors Pei Yan, Liu Rengui, Liu Jingxian, and Guo Zhengyi are in charge of assisting the emperor, every important issue should be discussed with the Empress of Heaven, and done by arbitration her. If there is something in the army and government that can't be decided quickly, then the decision is the responsibility of the Empress of Heaven, and the emperor stops!

During the mourning period, Pei Yan proposed that the throne be temporarily entrusted to Empress Wu, who was now the empress dowager, until the new emperor's reign and their responsibilities began, as provided for in Emperor Gaozong's will. After the end of mourning, Empress Dowager Wu handed over the throne to Emperor Zhongzong, but she did not hand over the real power, "the great and small affairs of the state depended on the Empress Dowager's decision, not the Emperor's". Emperor Zhongzong, in spring 684, made his wife, Crown Princess Wei, empress consort, and he was very impressed by Empress Wei, and she told him: "You are the Son of Heaven. Why do you have to listen to the Empress Dowager in everything? Do you want to be a puppet emperor?" Emperor Zhongzong felt that what the empress said was reasonable, but there was nothing he could do about it, Empress Wei went on to say: "For now, only by vigorously promoting your own people and cultivating your own power can you compete with the Empress Dowager and formally her government." He was impressed by her words and wanted to make his father-in-law, Wei Xuanzhen (韋玄貞) Palace Attendant, the head of the Chancellery and a default chancellor. He also wanted to make the son of his wet nurse an official of the fifth rank. Pei Yan resisted both commissions, and Pei told him: "Although Wei Xuanzhen is your wife's father, he has been promoted too fast and I'm afraid it will be difficult to convince the public.". As they argued, Emperor Zhongzong, in anger, remarked, "What would be wrong even if I gave the empire to Wei Xuanzhen? Why would I begrudge him the title of Palace Attendant?"

Pei, in fear, informed Empress Dowager Wu, and she was angry to hear this and said, "This apostate boy treats the Tang Dynasty like a childish game, and it forces me to erase a disaster from the world." Just less than two months after Emperor Zhongzong had taken the throne, Empress Dowager Wu summoned the officials and generals and issued an edict deposing Emperor Zhongzong and reducing him to the title of Prince of Luling. As generals loyal to her physically removed Emperor Zhongzong from the throne, he struggled and asked, "What crime have I committed?" Empress Dowager Wu responded, "You wanted to give the empire to Wei Xuanzhen. How can that not be a crime?" She had him put under arrest, and she made Li Lun (now renamed Li Dan), Prince of Yu, the new emperor (posthumously remembered as Emperor Ruizong) on 27 February. Li Chongzhao was reduced to commoner rank.

== In exile ==
Empress Dowager Wu soon ordered that Li Zhe and his family first be delivered to Fang Prefecture (房州, in modern Shiyan, Hubei), and then Jun Prefecture (均州, also in modern Shiyan), to be held under house arrest at the house that his uncle Li Tai had been placed after Li Tai was deposed in 643. (Subsequently, in 685, he was moved back to Fang Prefecture.) On the way to exile, Princess Wei gave birth to a daughter. There was nothing to wrap the baby with, so Li Zhe took off his own shirt and wrapped the baby in it. To commemorate this, the daughter was subsequently named Li Guo'er (Guo'er meaning "the child that was wrapped"). Li Zhe and Princess Wei both greatly favored this child born in distress.

Li Zhe was constantly in fear in exile, as Empress Dowager Wu had previously shown willingness to kill her own children—having forced Li Xián to commit suicide in 684 and having been rumored to have poisoned another son, Li Hong, in 675—and whenever there would be imperial messengers arriving from then-capital Luoyang, he would consider committing suicide, fearing that they brought orders for even worse fates. Princess Wei would repeatedly tell him:

There is no set pattern to bad and good fortune. Since we will all die one day anyway, why hasten death?

At this point, they were deeply in love with each other, and at another point, he told her:

If we will see the light of day again, I will not stop you from doing anything.

While Li Zhe was in exile, people who rebelled against or plotted against Empress Dowager Wu often used him as a symbol of their resistance. For example, when Li Jingye the Duke of Ying rose against Empress Dowager Wu later in 684, he declared that his goal was to restore Li Zhe. Other examples included Yang Chucheng (楊初成) in 687 and Li Yin (李諲) the Duke of Poyang (Emperor Gaozong's cousin) in 689.

In 690, Empress Dowager Wu had Emperor Ruizong yield the throne to her, and she took the throne as "empress regnant" of a new Zhou Dynasty, interrupting Tang. She created Emperor Ruizong crown prince with the unusual title Huangsi (皇嗣), and initially, Li Zhe's status was not changed.

== Second stint as crown prince in the reign of his mother Wu Zetian ==
In 697, during a major Khitan incursion, led by the khan Sun Wanrong, Sun issued a declaration questioning why Wu Zetian was keeping Li Zhe in exile. Thereafter, the chancellor Di Renjie often counseled Wu Zetian to recall Li Zhe, which fellow chancellors Wang Fangqing and Wang Jishan also agreed with. Further, Wu Zetian's close associate Ji Xu also advocated it and further persuaded her lovers Zhang Yizhi and Zhang Changzong to advocate the same. Wu Zetian finally agreed, and in 698 recalled Li Zhe and his family back to Luoyang, then the capital. Shortly thereafter, Li Dan offered to yield the crown prince position to Li Zhe, and Wu Zetian agreed, creating Li Zhe crown prince on 24 October, demoting Li Dan to the rank of Prince of Xiang. She also changed his name back to Li Xiǎn, and subsequently changed his surname to Wu. Subsequently, when she named him the nominal commander of the forces defending against a major Göktürk incursion on 26 October, it was said that as soon as he was named the commander, men swarmed to enlist. Before, less than 1000 men joined after more than a month of recruitment; the numbers swelled to more than 50000 after the announcement.

In 699, fearing that after her death the Li and Wu clans would not be able to keep peace with each other, Wu Zetian had Li Xiǎn, Li Dan, Princess Taiping, and her husband Wu Youji (Wu Zetian's nephew) swear an oath to each other.

In 701, Li Chongzhao (now named Li Chongrun to observe naming taboo for Wu Zetian (whose personal name was Wu Zhao) and now carrying the title of Prince of Shao), Li Zhe's daughter Li Xianhui the Princess Yongtai, and Li Xianhui's husband Wu Yanji (武延基) the Prince of Wei (Wu Zetian's grandnephew), were accused of secretly disparaging Wu Zetian's relationships with Zhang Yizhi and Zhang Changzong. In anger, Wu Zetian ordered the three of them to commit suicide.

In spring 705, Wu Zetian was seriously ill, and Zhang Yizhi and Zhang Changzong were attending to her and, at her direction, handling the major affairs of state, and there were rumors that they were seeking to displace Li Xiǎn. The chancellors Zhang Jianzhi and Cui Xuanwei, along with other officials Jing Hui, Huan Yanfan, and Yuan Shuji plotted to overthrow her and the Zhang brothers. They persuaded the generals Li Duozuo and Li Dan (李湛, note different character than the Prince of Xiang) to join the plot. With agreement from Li Xiǎn as well, the coup leaders acted on 20 February, killing Zhang Yizhi and Zhang Changzong, and then surrounding Wu Zetian. She, in fear, asked, "Who is disturbing me?" Zhang Jianzhi responded, in a formalistic manner:

Zhang Yizhi and Zhang Changzong committed treason. Following the orders of the Crown Prince, we have executed them. Because we were afraid that the secret would be leaked, we did not dare to first report to Your Imperial Majesty. We are guilty of the great disrespect of moving troops within the palace, and should be executed 10,000 times.

Wu Zetian subsequently tried to have Li Xiǎn returned to the palace of the Crown Prince, but the coup leaders ignored her. While the coup leaders allowed Wu Zetian to retain the title of "emperor," they had her put under house arrest at the secondary palace Shangyang Palace (上陽宮) and forced her to yield the throne to Li Xiǎn, who was formerly emperor, and he was restored to the throne (as Emperor Zhongzong).

== Second reign: under Empress Wei's shadow ==
Emperor Zhongzong once again ascended to the throne, which is different from the first time he was a puppet. This time he truly mastered the power and quickly used it handily. Once restored, Emperor Zhongzong initially put the five coup leaders in prominent positions. However, Empress Wei, once restored, became the most major, powerful and dominant figure at court, along with her daughter Li Guo'er, who now carried the title of Princess Anle and formed a faction that wielded strong control over the court and consolidated her power. The only mother-daughter rival for dominate the emperor's grace and power was the Emperor Zhongzong's sister, Princess Taiping, who also had great favor with Emperor Zhongzong and was one of the most powerful women in the court. Also powerful was Wu Zetian's secretary Shangguan Wan'er, whom Emperor Zhongzong took as a concubine, who was also having an affair with Wu Zetian's nephew Wu Sansi the Prince of Liang. Under her introduction, Empress Wei and Wu Sansi also soon started having an affair. With Consort Shangguan's and Empress Wei's influence, Wu Sansi became a powerful and trusted advisor to Emperor Zhongzong. Meanwhile, Empress Wei, disliking Emperor Zhongzong's oldest surviving son Li Chongfu the Prince of Qiao (born of a concubine), falsely accused Li Chongfu of being complicit in Li Chongrun's death. Emperor Zhongzong demoted Li Chongfu out of the capital to serve as a prefectural prefect, under heavy guard. Emperor Zhongzong initially offered the crown prince position to Li Dan, but after Li Dan declined, created another son by a concubine, Li Chongjun, crown prince.

The coup leaders, meanwhile, were trying to curb Wu Sansi's rise, but in turn, Wu Sansi and Empress Wei repeatedly warned Emperor Zhongzong that the coup leaders were overly powerful and dangerous. In fall 705, Emperor Zhongzong agreed, and created the coup leaders princes under guise of honoring them, but removed them from their chancellor positions.

In winter 705, Wu Zetian died. Her "emperor" title was subsequently removed and empress title restored, and Emperor Zhongzong buried her at Qianling, with his father Emperor Gaozong. (Also buried there were Emperor Zhongzong's brother Li Xián, Li Chongrun, and Li Xianhui.)

In spring 706, after Emperor Zhongzong's son-in-law Wang Tongjiao (王同皎, husband of Princess Ding'an), who despised Empress Wei and Wu Sansi, was accused of plotting to kill Wu Sansi and depose Empress Wei, Wang and his alleged coconspirators were executed, and subsequently, Wu Sansi and his associates accused Jing Hui, Huan Yanfan, Zhang Jianzhi, Yuan Shuji, and Cui Xuanwei of being complicit in Wang's plot. The five princes were exiled and subsequently died or were killed in exile.

In 707, Li Chongjun, angry that Li Guo'er and her husband Wu Chongxun (武崇訓, Wu Sansi's son) had repeatedly humiliated him and tried to get Li Guo'er created crown princess to displace him, rose in rebellion with Li Duozuo and the generals Li Sichong (李思沖), Li Chengkuang (李承況), Dugu Yizhi (獨孤禕之), and Shazha Zhongyi (沙吒忠義), along with Emperor Zhongzong's cousin Li Qianli (李千里) the Prince of Cheng and Li Qianli's son LI Xi (李禧) the Prince of Tianshui. They attacked Wu Sansi's mansion and killed Wu Sansi and Wu Chongxun, and then marched on to the palace, trying to seize Consort Shangguan, Empress Wei, and Li Guo'er. The rebels hesitated at attacking the palace, and the imperial guards fought back. After the eunuch Yang Sixu (楊思勗) killed Li Duozuo's son-in-law Ye Huli (野呼利), and Emperor Zhongzong made a personal appeal to the coup forces, the coup forces turned against Li Chongjun, killing the generals commanding them. Li Chongjun fled but was killed in exile. Subsequently, the senior chancellor Wei Yuanzhong, whose son Wei Sheng (魏升) had been forced to join the rebellion, was exiled and killed in exile at the instigation of two chancellors aligned with Empress Wei and Li Guo'er, Zong Chuke and Ji Chuna. However, attempts by Empress Wei's party to implicate Li Dan and Princess Taiping were unsuccessful.

Meanwhile, the court was dominated by a number of powerful women, including Li Guo'er, Princess Changning (Emperor Zhongzong's and Empress Wei's older daughter), Empress Wei's sister Lady of Cheng, Consort Shangguan, Consort Shangguan's mother Lady Zheng of Pei, senior ladies in waiting Chai and Helou, the sorceress Diwu Ying'er (第五英兒), and Lady Zhao of Longxi. These women were openly accepting bribes, and were able to recommend a number of people to be officials, directly commissioned by Emperor Zhongzong without approval from the legislative (中書省, Zhongshu Sheng) and examination (門下省, Menxia Sheng) bureaus. The civil service system was said to be overrun with corruption and running into near collapse.

In winter 708, after the Turgesh (突騎施) chieftain Suoge (娑葛), who had just succeeded his father Wuzhile (烏質勒), was challenged by Wuzhile's subordinate Kül Čor (Quechuo 闕啜) Ashina Zhongjie (阿史那忠節), Zhongjie, who was unable to prevail over Suoge, bribed Zong and Ji to persuade Emperor Zhongzong to prepare a joint attack against the Turgesh with the Tibetan Empire, despite counsel by the general Guo Yuanzhen against it. When Suoge heard this, he launched an attack preemptively, attacking several key Tang garrisons, capturing Zhongjie, and killing the Tang general Feng Jiabin (馮嘉賓), who had been sent to assist Zhongjie. Subsequently, after Emperor Zhongzong recognized Suoge's authority over the Turgesh tribes, hostility ceased, and Suoge again became a Tang vassal.

In spring 710, Emperor Zhongzong sent Princess Jincheng, the daughter of his nephew Li Shouli the Prince of Yong (Li Xián's son), to the Tibetan Empire to be married to its emperor, Me Agtsom, cementing peace between the two states.

== Death ==
Meanwhile, there had been accusations made by individuals such as Lang Ji (郎岌) and Yan Qinrong (燕欽融) that Empress Wei was committing adultery, and that her partisans, including Li Guo'er, her new husband Wu Yanxiu (武延秀, a grandnephew of Wu Zetian), and Zong Chuke, were planning to overthrow the Tang dynasty. Emperor Zhongzong ordered Lang executed, but became displeased when Zong had Yan killed without Emperor Zhongzong having decided to do so. This caused Empress Wei and her partisans to begin to become apprehensive. Empress Wei was, meanwhile, having affairs with the officials Ma Qinke (馬秦客) and Yang Jun (楊均). She wanted to be Empress Regnant like Wu Zetian, and Li Guo'er wanted to be crown princess—a request that Emperor Zhongzong had repeatedly rebuffed. According to traditional historians, they thus decided to have Emperor Zhongzong killed. They accomplished this by putting poison in a cake, and after Emperor Zhongzong ate the cake, he died on 3 July 710.

Initially, Emperor Zhongzong's son by a concubine, Li Chongmao the Prince of Wen, was named emperor, with Empress Wei retaining power as empress dowager and regent. Less than a month later, Princess Taiping and Li Dan's son Li Longji the Prince of Linzi rose in rebellion and killed Empress Wei and Li Guo'er. Subsequently, Li Dan took the throne again, displacing Emperor Shang. Shortly thereafter, Emperor Zhongzong was buried in an imperial burial. As Empress Wei was considered unsuitable to be buried with him, Emperor Ruizong was set to bury Emperor Zhongzong's first wife Princess Zhao, whom Emperor Zhongzong had posthumously honored an empress, with him, but Princess Zhao's body could no longer be located. Therefore, a ceremony was held in which her spirit was summoned to accompany Emperor Zhongzong in death.

== In fiction and popular culture ==
- Portrayed by Eddie Kwan Lai Kit in Destined to Rebel (1986).
- Portrayed by Raymond Cho in The Greatness of a Hero (2009).

== Era names ==
=== First reign ===
- Sisheng (嗣聖 sì shèng) 684

=== Second reign ===
- Shenlong (神龍 shén lóng) 705–707 (inherited from Wu Zetian)
- Jinglong (景龍 jǐng lóng) 707–710

== Chancellors during reign ==
=== First reign ===
- Liu Rengui (683–684)
- Pei Yan (683–684)
- Guo Daiju (683–684)
- Cen Changqian (683–684)
- Guo Zhengyi (683–684)
- Wei Xuantong (683–684)
- Liu Jingxian (683–684)
- Wei Hongmin (684)

=== Second reign ===
- Wei Anshi (705, 705–706, 709–710)
- Cui Xuanwei (705)
- Yao Yuanzhi (705)
- Yang Zaisi (705–709)
- Tang Xiujing (705–706, 709–710)
- Zhang Jianzhi (705)
- Fang Rong (705)
- Wei Chengqing (705)
- Yuan Shuji (705)
- Li Dan (705)
- Jing Hui (705)
- Huan Yanfan (705)
- Wu Sansi (705)
- Zhu Qinming (705–706)
- Wei Yuanzhong (705–707)
- Li Huaiyuan (705–706, 706)
- Doulu Qinwang (705–709)
- Wei Juyuan (705, 706–710)
- Li Jiao (706–710)
- Yu Weiqian (706–707)
- Su Gui (706–707, 709–710)
- Zong Chuke (707–710)
- Ji Chuna (707–710)
- Xiao Zhizhong (707–710)
- Zhang Renyuan (708–710)
- Wei Sili (709–710)
- Cui Shi (709)
- Zhao Yanzhao (709–710)
- Wei Wen (709–710)
- Zheng Yin (709)

== Family ==
- Empress Hesi, of the Zhao clan (和思皇后 趙氏/和思皇后 赵氏; d. 675), first cousin once removed
- Empress, of the Wei clan of Jingzhao (皇后 京兆韋氏／京兆韦氏; d. 710)
  - Li Chongrun, Crown Prince Yide (懿德皇太子 李重潤／懿德皇太子 李重润; 682–701), second son
  - Princess Changning (長寧公主／长宁公主), fourth daughter
    - Married Yang Shenjiao of Hongnong, Duke Guan (弘農 楊慎交／弘弄 杨慎交; 675–724), and had issue (two sons, one daughter)
    - Married Su Yanbo (蘇彥伯／苏彦伯) in 728
  - Princess Yongshou (永壽公主／永寿公主), fifth daughter
    - Married Wei Hui of Jingzhao, Duke Pengcheng (京兆 韋鐬／京兆 韦钺)
  - Princess Yongtai (永泰公主; 685–701), personal name Xianhui (仙蕙), seventh daughter
    - Married Wu Yanji (武延基; 679–701), the first son of Wu Chengsi, in 700
  - Princess Anle (安樂公主／安乐公主; 685–710), personal name Guo'er (裹兒／裹儿), eighth daughter
    - Married Wu Chongxun (武崇訓／武崇训; 683–707), a son of Wu Sansi, and had issue (one son)
    - Married Wu Yanxiu (武延秀; 685–710), the sixth son of Wu Chengsi, and had issue (one son)
- Noble Consort Zheng, of the Zheng clan (郑贵妃 郑氏), personal name Pusi (普思)
- Second Imperial Concubine, of the Shangguan clan (惠文昭容 上官氏; 664–710), personal name Wan'er (婉兒／婉儿)
- Lady, of a certain clan (姓不详)
  - Li Chongfu, Prince Qiao (譙王 李重福／谯王 李重福; 680–710), first son
- Lady, of a certain clan (姓不详)
  - Li Chongjun, Crown Prince Jiemin (節愍皇太子 李重俊／节愍皇太子李重俊; d. 707), third son
- Lady, of a certain clan (姓不详)
  - Li Chongmao, Emperor Shang (殇皇帝 李重茂; 695–714), fourth son
- Unknown
  - Princess Xindu (新都公主), first daughter
    - Married Wu Yanhui, Duke Chen (武延暉／武延晖), and had issue (one son)
  - Princess Yicheng (宜城公主), second daughter
    - Married Pei Xun of Hedong, Duke Wei (河東 裴巽/河东 裴巽; 672–726) in 698
  - Princess Ding'an (定安公主; d. 733), third daughter
    - Married Wang Tongjiao of Langya, Duke Langya (瑯琊 王同皎; 671–706), and had issue (one son)
    - Married Wei Zhuo of Jingzhao (京兆 韋濯／京兆 韦濯; d. 710), and had issue (one son)
    - Married Cui Xian of Boling (博陵 崔銑／博陵 崔铣) in 710
  - Princess Cheng'an (成安公主), sixth daughter
    - Married Wei Jie of Jingzhao (京兆 韋捷／京兆 韦捷; d. 710), and had issue (one daughter)

== See also ==
1. Chinese emperors family tree (middle)
2. Small Wild Goose Pagoda

Emperor Zhongzong of Tang House of Li Born: 26 November 656 Died: 3 July 710
Regnal titles
Preceded by Emperor Gaozong of Tang	Emperor of the Tang dynasty 684 with Empress Dowager Wu	Succeeded by Emperor Ruizong of Tang
Preceded by Emperor Gaozong of Tang	Emperor of China; Tang; 684	Succeeded by Emperor Ruizong of Tang
Preceded by None (dynasty interrupted)	Emperor of the Tang dynasty 705–710 with Empress Wei	Succeeded by Emperor Shang of Tang
