= Zhang Jianzhi (Tang dynasty) =

Chinese Tang dynasty official (died 706)

Zhang Jianzhi (張柬之) (625 – 706), courtesy name Mengjiang (孟將), formally Prince Wenzhen of Hanyang (漢陽文貞王), was an official of the Chinese Tang dynasty and Wu Zetian's Zhou dynasty, serving as chancellor during the reigns of Wu Zetian and her son Emperor Zhongzong. He was a key figure in the coup (Shenlong Coup) that overthrew Wu Zetian and restored Emperor Zhongzong in 705 but was later exiled due to false accusations instigated by Wu Zetian's nephew Wu Sansi and died in exile.

== Background ==
Zhang Jianzhi was born in 625, during the reign of Emperor Gaozu. His family was from Xiang Prefecture (襄州, roughly modern Xiangfan, Hubei). In his youth, he was a student at the imperial university, and he was said to have a broad study in the Confucian classics and history, but particularly favored studying the Three Rites (i.e., the Classic of Rites, the Rites of Zhou, and the Yili "Etiquette and Rites"). He was respected by the principal of the imperial university Linghu Defen. After he passed the imperial examinations, he was made the magistrate of Qingcheng County (青城, in modern Chengdu, Sichuan). However, little further is known about his career until 689, other than that in or before 676, he was serving as the cashier for Li Sujie the Prince of Xun, a son of Emperor Gaozong (Emperor Taizong's son) and Emperor Gaozong's concubine Consort Xiao, who was killed in 655 due to machinations by Emperor Gaozong's second wife Empress Wu (later known as Wu Zetian). Li Sujie, denied the privilege of seeing his father after his mother's death, had written an essay entitled Commentary on Faithfulness and Filial Piety (忠孝論), and Zhang secretly submitted the essay to Emperor Gaozong. After Empress Wu read it, it drew her ire, and she falsely accused Li Sujie of corruption and had him demoted and put under house arrest.

In 689, by which time Empress Wu was serving as empress dowager and regent over her son Emperor Ruizong, she held a competition for scholars willing to offer suggestions for the imperial administration. Zhang participated in the competition and was ranked first among the thousands of contestants. She promoted him to be an imperial censor.

== During Wu Zetian's reign ==
Early in Wu Zetian's Shengli era (697–700) (when she was ruling as Empress Regnant of a new Zhou dynasty, interrupting the Tang dynasty), Zhang Jianzhi was promoted to be Fengge Sheren (鳳閣舍人), a mid-level official at the legislative bureau of government (鳳閣, Fengge). Around that time, he had a debate with the imperial scholar Wang Yuangan (王元感) over whether the traditional three-year mourning period for a parent's death should be three full years (as Wang advocated) or 25 months—i.e., two full calendar years, extending into the first month of the next year (as Zhang advocated). The people at the time were said to be largely approving Zhang's interpretation.

In 698, Wu Zetian was set to enter into a marriage treaty with Ashina Mochuo, the khan of Eastern Tujue, where her grandnephew Wu Yanxiu (武延秀) the Prince of Huaiyang would marry a daughter of Ashina Mochuo. Zhang opposed, stating, "In ancient times, no Chinese imperial prince had ever married a barbarian woman as his wife." This opposition drew displeasure from Wu Zetian, as she wanted peace with Eastern Tujue, and she demoted Zhang to be the prefect of He Prefecture (合州, modern northern Chongqing). (Note: However, the marriage treaty would be doomed, as Ashina Mochuo, not actually having any intent to give a daughter to Wu Yanxiu or to make peace with Wu Zetian, used the excuse that he had intended to marry his daughter to a prince of the Tang imperial Li clan to instead detain Wu Yanxiu and launch a major attack on Zhou.) Later that year, Zhang was serving as the prefect of Shu Prefecture (蜀州, in modern Chengdu), when he made the suggestion that Shu Prefecture, which was required to send 500 conscript soldiers to take up garrison at Yao Prefecture (姚州, roughly modern Chuxiong Yi Autonomous Prefecture, Yunnan), no longer be required to do so, as the road was treacherous and the conditions were so severe that many would die—and further that no garrison be put up at Yao Prefecture at all, treating it as vassal territory rather than part of Zhou proper. Wu Zetian did not accept his suggestion.

At some time prior to 700, Zhang was serving as the secretary general of Jing Prefecture (荊州, roughly modern Jingzhou, Hubei), when, on one occasion, Wu Zetian was having a conversation with the senior chancellor Di Renjie, asking Di's recommendation for someone with extraordinary talent, to serve as chancellor or general. Di responded, "As far as literary talent is concerned, Your Imperial Majesty already have them in Su Weidao and Li Jiao [Di's fellow chancellors], but if you truly want extraordinary talent, I know Zhang Jianzhi, the secretary general of Jing Prefecture. Even though he is old, he is capable of being chancellor." In response, Wu Zetian promoted Zhang to be the military advisor to the prefect of the capital prefecture Luo Prefecture (洛州, roughly modern Luoyang, Henan), sending Yang Yuanyan (楊元琰) to replace him. (When Yang reached Jing Prefecture, Zhang and Yang rowed a boat on the Yangtze River together, and they secretly discussed Wu Zetian's overthrow of the Tang dynasty. During the conversation, Yang expressed sentiment that he wanted to see Tang's restoration—a sentiment that Zhang kept in his mind for later.) A few days after Zhang's promotion, Wu Zetian was again asking Di for a recommendation, and Di responded, "I had just recommended Zhang Jianzhi, and Your Imperial Majesty has not yet promoted him." She responded, "I already did." Di responded, "I recommended a chancellor, not a military advisor." Wu Zetian then, while not promoting Zhang to be chancellor at that time, promoted him to be the deputy minister of justice (秋官侍郎, Qiuguan Shilang).

In 704, as the chancellor Yao Yuanzhi was set to briefly leave Luoyang to serve as the commander of the forces in the Lingwu region, Wu Zetian also asked him to recommend a talented official. Yao responded, "Zhang Jianzhi is deep-thinking and capable of ruling on great things. He is already old. Please promote him quickly." Wu Zetian therefore gave Zhang the designation Tong Fengge Luantai Pingzhangshi (同鳳閣鸞臺平章事), making him a chancellor de facto at the age of 79.

In spring 705, with Wu Zetian being ill, Zhang entered into a plot with a number of officials and generals, including Cui Xuanwei, Huan Yanfan, Jing Hui, and Yuan Shuji, to kill Wu Zetian's lovers Zhang Yizhi and Zhang Changzong, who had become powerful much to the distaste of the chancellors. Zhang reminded Yang of his prior desire to restore Tang, and put him, Huan, Jing, and a general who agreed to the plot, Li Dan (李湛), in charge of some of the corps of the imperial guards. He further persuaded the ethnically Mohe general Li Duozuo to join the plot as well, persuading Li Duozuo, who felt indebted to Emperor Gaozong for having promoted him, that Zhang Yizhi and Zhang Changzong were endangering the positions of Emperor Gaozong's sons with Wu Zetian, Li Xian the Crown Prince and Li Dan the Prince of Xiang (note different character than the general). He also received agreement from Yao. With agreement from Li Xian as well, the coup leaders acted on February 20, (Note: The New Book of Tang recorded the same date, but gave the year as the 5th year of the Chang'an era.) killing Zhang Yizhi and Zhang Changzong, and then surrounding Wu Zetian. She, in fear, asked, "Who is disturbing me?" Zhang Jianzhi responded, in a formalistic manner:

Zhang Yizhi and Zhang Changzong committed treason. Following the orders of the Crown Prince, we have executed them. Because we were afraid that the secret would be leaked, we did not dare to first report to Your Imperial Majesty. We are guilty of the great disrespect of moving troops within the palace, and should be executed 10,000 times.

Wu Zetian subsequently tried to have Li Xian returned to the palace of the Crown Prince, but the coup leaders ignored her. While the coup leaders allowed Wu Zetian to retain the title of "emperor," they had her put under house arrest at the secondary palace Shangyang Palace (上陽宮) and forced her to yield the throne to Li Xian, who was formerly emperor, and he was restored to the throne (as Emperor Zhongzong).

== During Emperor Zhongzong's second reign ==
Zhang Jianzhi, along with Cui Xuanwei, Huan Yanfan, Jing Hui, and Yuan Shuji, were recognized as leaders in Emperor Zhongzong's restoration, and they were put into key positions and created dukes, with Zhang becoming the minister of defense (夏官尚書, Xiaguan Shangshu) and remaining chancellor with the Tong Fengge Luantai Pingzhangshi designation and carrying the title of Duke of Hanyang. He and the other coup leaders instituted a regime of restoring Tang institutions and deprecating Zhou ones, and when Yao Yuanzhi displayed distress at Wu Zetian's removal to Shangyang Palace, Zhang and Huan had him demoted out of the capital. Soon, however, Emperor Zhongzong became full heavily influenced by his wife Empress Wei and her lover Wu Sansi the Prince of Liang (Wu Zetian's nephew and Emperor Zhongzong's cousin). (One of the coup participants, Xue Jichang (薛季昶), had advocated to Zhang Jianzhi and Jing the killing of Wu Sansi in the aftermaths of the killing of Zhang Yizhi and Zhang Changzong, but neither Zhang Jianzhi nor Jing paid Xue's suggestion much heed until it was too late.) After realizing that Wu Sansi's power was on the rise, Zhang Jianzhi tried to persuade Emperor Zhongzong to reduce the power of the Wu clan on the whole but was unable to get Emperor Zhongzong to listen. Meanwhile, Zhang Jianzhi was made Zhongshu Ling (中書令), the head of the legislative bureau (now returned to the prior name of Zhongshu Sheng (中書省)).

In summer 705, Under the full influence of his wife Empress Wei, by which time Emperor Zhongzong's trust in Zhang and his colleagues had completely been lost, Emperor Zhongzong, following Wu Sansi's recommendation, created the five coup leader's princes—in Zhang's case, Prince of Hanyang—but stripped them of chancellor positions. Zhang soon requested to retire back to his home prefecture Xiang Prefecture, and Emperor Zhongzong agreed, making him the prefect of Xiang Prefecture, but not putting him in actual responsibility of the prefecture. His son Zhang Yi (張漪) was made a low-level imperial official but ordered to follow his father to Xiang Prefecture.

In spring 706, with all five of the coup leaders already out of the capital, Wu Sansi and Empress Wei made accusations against them, and they were demoted to more remote prefectures (although Zhang was not moved). Wu Sansi then had his strategist Zheng Yin further accuse the five of them of having participated in the plot of Emperor Zhongzong's son-in-law Wang Tongjiao (王同皎) -- who was executed on 23 April 706 after having been accused of plotting to kill Wu Sansi and deposing Empress Wei. The five were further demoted on 20 July (Note: According to the Old Book of Tang, the five coup leaders of the Shenlong coup were demoted on the wu'yin day of the 6th month of the 2nd year of the Shenlong era, which corresponds to 20 July 706 in the Julian calendar.) with the provisions that they would never be allowed to return to the capital Chang'an, with Zhang becoming the military advisor to the prefect of Xin Prefecture (新州, roughly modern Yunfu, Guangdong). Wu Sansi then had accusations that Empress Wei was having affairs posted publicly in Luoyang (now eastern capital, with the capital moved back to Chang'an), with the intent of incensing Emperor Zhongzong—and then accused the five coup leaders of being behind this public humiliation. He then had his associates propose that the five be killed. Emperor Zhongzong, citing that the five had been previously awarded iron certificates that guaranteed that they would not be executed in recognition of their contribution, ordered that they be reduced to commoner rank and permanently exiled to the Lingnan region with their families—in Zhang's case, to Long Prefecture (瀧州, in modern Ganzhou, Jiangxi). At the suggestion of Cui Shi, Wu Sansi then sent the censor Zhou Lizhen (周利貞) to the Lingnan region under guise of reviewing the affairs of the region but with instructions to kill the five. By the time that Zhou reached the region, though, Zhang had already died. After Emperor Zhongzong's death in 710 and Li Dan, himself a former emperor, was restored (as Emperor Ruizong), Zhang and his colleagues were posthumously honored.

== Notes and references ==
- Old Book of Tang, vol.91
- New Book of Tang, vol.120
- Zizhi Tongjian, vols. 202, 206, 207, 208.
