= Yuan Shuji =

Chinese Tang dynasty chancellor (died 706)

Yuan Shuji (Chinese: 袁恕己; died 706), posthumous name Prince Zhenlie of Nanyang (南陽貞烈王), was an official of China's Tang dynasty and Wu Zhou dynasty, serving as chancellor during the reign of Emperor Zhongzong. He was a key figure in the coup (Shenlong Coup) that overthrew Wu Zetian and restored Emperor Zhongzong in 705 but was later exiled due to false accusations instigated by Wu Zetian's nephew Wu Sansi and killed in exile in a cruel manner.

== Background ==
It is not known when Yuan Shuji was born. His family was from Cang Prefecture (滄州, roughly modern Cangzhou, Hebei) and traced its ancestry to the late Han dynasty warlord Yuan Shao. Both Yuan Shuji's grandfather Yuan Lingxi (袁令喜) and father Yuan Yihong (袁異弘) served as prefectural officials.

== During Wu Zetian's reign ==
Sometime during Wu Zetian's Chang'an era (701-704), Yuan Shuji served as assistant chief judge of the supreme court (司刑少卿, Sixing Shaoqing) and military advisor to Wu Zetian's son Li Dan the Prince of Xiang. As of 704, he was serving as Youtai Zhongcheng (右臺中丞), an imperial censor.

In spring 705, with Wu Zetian being ill, Cui entered into a plot with a number of officials and generals, including Zhang Jianzhi, Cui Xuanwei, Huan Yanfan, and Jing Hui, to kill her lovers Zhang Yizhi and Zhang Changzong. With agreement from Li Xian the Crown Prince (Wu Zetian's son and Li Dan's older brother), they acted on February 20, killing Zhang Yizhi and Zhang Changzong, and then surrounding Wu Zetian. While they allowed her to retain the title of "emperor," they had her put under house arrest at the secondary palace Shangyang Palace (上陽宮) and forced her to yield the throne to Li Xian, who was formerly emperor, and he was restored to the throne (as Emperor Zhongzong). During the coup, Yuan's responsibility was to accompany Li Dan and make sure that no unusual incidents would happen involving Li Dan, and after coup was successful, Yuan was immediately made, by an edict issued in Wu Zetian's name, Fengge Shilang (鳳閣侍郎), the deputy head of the legislative bureau of government (鳳閣, Fengge) and given the designation Tong Fengge Luantai Pingzhangshi (同鳳閣鸞臺平章事). Two days later, Emperor Zhongzong was formally restored.

== During Emperor Zhongzong's second reign ==
Yuan Shuji, along with Zhang Jianzhi, Cui Xuanwei, Huan Yanfan, and Jing Hui, were recognized as leaders in Emperor Zhongzong's restoration, and they were put into key positions and created dukes, with Yuan becoming continuing to serve as Fengge Shilang and carrying the greater chancellor designation of Tong Fengge Luantai Sanpin (同鳳閣鸞臺三品) and carrying the title of Duke of Nanyang. One of the main acts that Yuan was recorded to have done was to speak against the deputy minister of construction Yang Wulian (楊務廉), accusing Yang of encouraging wasteful construction and not making useful suggestions to the emperor, and Yang was demoted to be a prefectural prefect. Yuan was then further elevated to be Zhongshu Ling (中書令), the head of the legislative bureau (which by this point had been renamed Zhongshu Sheng (中書省)). Soon, however, Emperor Zhongzong became deeply and heavily influenced by his powerful wife Empress Wei and her lover Wu Sansi the Prince of Liang (Wu Zetian's nephew and Emperor Zhongzong's cousin). Zhang fervently argued against the rise of Wu Sansi's power but was unable to do anything about it. In summer 705, by which time Emperor Zhongzong's trust in Yuan and his colleagues had completely been lost, Emperor Zhongzong, following Wu Sansi's recommendation, created the five coup leaders princes—in Yuan's case, Prince of Nanyang—but stripped them of chancellor positions. In spring 706, Yuan was further sent out of the capital Chang'an to serve as the prefect of Yu Prefecture (豫州, roughly modern Zhumadian, Henan).

Later in spring 706, with all five of the coup leaders already out of the capital, Wu Sansi and Empress Wei made accusations against them, and they were demoted to more remote prefectures—in Yuan's case, to be the prefect of Ying Prefecture (郢州, roughly modern Wuhan, Hubei). Wu Sansi then had his strategist Zheng Yin further accuse the five of them of having participated in the plot of Emperor Zhongzong's son-in-law Wang Tongjiao (王同皎) -- who was executed early in 706 after having been accused of plotting to kill Wu Sansi and deposing Empress Wei. The five were further demoted with the provisions that they would never be allowed to return to the capital Chang'an, with Yuan becoming the military advisor to the prefect of Dou Prefecture (竇州, roughly modern Maoming, Guangdong). Wu Sansi then had accusations that Empress Wei was having affairs posted publicly in the eastern capital Luoyang, with the intent of incensing Emperor Zhongzong—and then accused the five coup leaders of being behind this public humiliation. He then had his associates propose that the five be killed. Emperor Zhongzong, citing that the five had been previously awarded iron certificates that guaranteed that they would not be executed in recognition of their contribution, ordered that they be reduced to commoner rank and permanently exiled to the Lingnan region with their families—in Yuan's case, to Huan Prefecture (環州, roughly modern Hechi, Guangxi). At the suggestion of Cui Shi, Wu Sansi then sent the censor Zhou Lizhen (周利貞) to the Lingnan region under guise of reviewing the affairs of the region but with instructions to kill the five. When Zhou arrived at Yuan's place of exile, he forced Yuan to drink the juice of the poisonous plant Gelsemium elegans, but Yuan did not die immediately—a fact that traditional historians attributed to Yuan's frequently taking an alchemist medication known as "yellow gold" (黃金). However, he suffered immensely from the poison and was angry over how he was treated, and he toiled on the ground, scratching it, causing his nails to fall off. Zhou then had him caned to death. After Emperor Zhongzong's death in 710 and Li Dan, himself a former emperor, was restored (as Emperor Ruizong), Yuan and his colleagues were posthumously honored.

== Notes and references ==
- Old Book of Tang, vol. 91.
- New Book of Tang, vol. 120.
- Zizhi Tongjian, vols. 207, 208.
