= Jing Hui =

Official of Chinese Tang and Wu Zhou dynasty

Jing Hui (敬暉) (died 706), courtesy name Zhongye (仲瞱), formally Prince Sumin of Pingyang (平陽肅愍王), was an official of the Chinese Tang dynasty and Wu Zetian's Zhou dynasty, serving as chancellor during the reign of Emperor Zhongzong. He was a key figure in the coup that overthrew Wu Zetian and restored Emperor Zhongzong in 705, but was later exiled due to false accusations instigated by Wu Zetian's nephew Wu Sansi and killed in exile in a cruel manner.

== Background ==
It is not known when Jing Hui was born, but it is known that his family was from Jiang Prefecture (絳州, part of modern Yuncheng, Shanxi). He had several ancestors who served as officials for Tang dynasty and its predecessor Sui dynasty as well as the earlier dynasty Northern Qi, and it is known that his father Jing Shansong (敬山松) served as a county magistrate during Tang. All that is known about the early part of Jing Hui's career is that he passed the imperial examination when he was young.

== During Wu Zetian's reign ==
In 698—during the reign of Wu Zetian, the wife of Emperor Gaozong, who had declared herself "emperor" of a new Zhou dynasty, interrupting Tang—Jing Hui was made the prefect of Wei Prefecture (衛州, roughly modern Xinxiang, Henan). When he arrived at Wei Prefecture, it was in the aftermaths of a major Eastern Tujue incursion earlier in the year, and the local officials were all busy conscripting labor to build the city walls, despite the fact that it was also harvest season. Jing stated to his subordinates: "Even a city that is fortified with gold and water cannot be defended without food. Why abandon the harvest to build the defenses?" He released the laborers from their duty and allowed them to return to their field, and the people were very thankful.

Jing later successively served as deputy minister of defense (夏官侍郎, Xiaguan Shilang) and prefect of Tai Prefecture (泰州, roughly modern Taizhou, Jiangsu). In 701, he was recalled to the capital Luoyang to serve as the secretary general of the capital prefecture Luo Prefecture. Later in the year, when she took up residence for a period at the western capital Chang'an, Jing served as the deputy official in charge of Luoyang and was known for his talent and honesty. When Wu Zetian heard of this, she sent him an edict thanking him and awarding him with silk. In 702, when Wu Zetian briefly commissioned her nephew Wu Sansi to command an army, apparently intending to attack Eastern Tujue, she made Jing Wu Sansi's deputy, but eventually, the army was not launched. In 703, Jing was made Zhongtai You Cheng (中臺右丞), one of the secretaries general of the executive bureau of government (中臺, Zhongtai), and given the honorific title Yinqing Guanglu Daifu (銀青光祿大夫).

In spring 705, with Wu Zetian being ill, Jing entered into a plot with a number of officials and generals, including Zhang Jianzhi, Cui Xuanwei, Huan Yanfan, and Yuan Shuji, to kill her lovers Zhang Yizhi and Zhang Changzong. With agreement from Li Xian the Crown Prince (Wu Zetian's son), they acted on February 20, killing Zhang Yizhi and Zhang Changzong, and then surrounding Wu Zetian. While they allowed her to retain the title of "emperor," they had her put under house arrest at the secondary palace Shangyang Palace (上陽宮) and forced her to yield the throne to Li Xian, who was formerly emperor, and he was restored to the throne (as Emperor Zhongzong). Two days later, Emperor Zhongzong was formally restored.

== During Emperor Zhongzong's second reign ==
Jing Hui, along with Zhang Jianzhi, Cui Xuanwei, Huan Yanfan, and Yuan Shuji, were recognized as leaders in Emperor Zhongzong's restoration, and they were put into key positions and created dukes, with Jing becoming Nayan (納言) -- the head of the examination bureau of government (鸞臺, Luantai), and carrying the title of Duke of Pingyang, soon to be further promoted to be Duke of Qi. He and the other coup leaders instituted a regime of restoring Tang institutions and deprecating Zhou ones. (One of the coup participants, Xue Jichang (薛季昶), had advocated to Zhang Jianzhi and Jing the killing of Wu Sansi in the aftermaths of the killing of Zhang Yizhi and Zhang Changzong, but neither Zhang Jianzhi nor Jing paid Xue's suggestion much heed until it was too late; in fact, Jing argued hard against the killing of the Wus, even though another subordinate, Liu Youqiu, also advocated for the Wus' death and unsuccessfully tried to convince Jing and Huan.) After realizing that Wu Sansi's power was on the rise, Jing tried to persuade Emperor Zhongzong to reduce the power of the Wu clan on the whole, but was unable to get Emperor Zhongzong to listen, and it was said that the popular sentiment at the time much blamed Jing for the rise of Wu Sansi. It was said that Jing often caressed his seat and sighed, and at times squeezed his hand so tightly into a fist that his fingernails broke the skin of his hand, causing it to bleed. Apprehensive of Wu Sansi, he asked the official Cui Shi to keep an eye on Wu Sansi, but when Cui realized that Emperor Zhongzong trusted Wu Sansi and distrusted the coup leaders, instead revealed all of the coup leaders' plans to Wu Sansi to allow Wu Sansi to anticipate them.

In summer 705, by which time Emperor Zhongzong's trust in Jing and his colleagues had completely been lost, Emperor Zhongzong, following Wu Sansi's recommendation, created the five coup leaders' princes—in Jing's case, Prince of Pingyang—but stripped them of chancellor positions. In spring 706, Jing was further sent out of Chang'an, which was now capital again, to serve as the prefect of Hua Prefecture (滑州, roughly modern Anyang, Henan).

Later in spring 706, with all five of the coup leaders already out of the capital, Wu Sansi and Empress Wei made accusations against them, and they were demoted to more remote prefectures—in Jing's case, to be the prefect of Lang Prefecture (朗州, roughly modern Changde, Hunan). Wu Sansi then had his strategist Zheng Yin further accuse the five of them of having participated in the plot of Emperor Zhongzong's son-in-law Wang Tongjiao (王同皎) -- who was executed early in 706 after having been accused of plotting to kill Wu Sansi and deposing Empress Wei. The five were further demoted with the provisions that they would never be allowed to return to the capital Chang'an, with Jing becoming the military advisor to the prefect of Yai Prefecture (崖州, in modern Haikou, Hainan). Wu Sansi then had accusations that Empress Wei was having affairs posted publicly in Luoyang, with the intent of incensing Emperor Zhongzong—and then accused the five coup leaders of being behind this public humiliation. He then had his associates propose that the five be killed. Emperor Zhongzong, citing that the five had been previously awarded iron certificates that guaranteed that they would not be executed in recognition of their contribution, ordered that they be reduced to commoner rank and permanently exiled to the Lingnan region with their families—in Jing's case, to Qiong Prefecture. At the suggestion of Cui Shi, Wu Sansi then sent the censor Zhou Lizhen (周利貞) to the Lingnan region under guise of reviewing the affairs of the region but with instructions to kill the five. When Zhou arrived at Jing's place of exile, he had Jing's flesh cut out piece by piece until Jing died. After Emperor Zhongzong's death in 710 and Emperor Zhongzong's brother Li Dan the Prince of Xiang, himself a former emperor, was restored (as Emperor Ruizong), Jing and his colleagues were posthumously honored. Four of his sons later served as officials.

== Notes and references ==
- Old Book of Tang, vol. 91.
- New Book of Tang, vol. 120.
- Zizhi Tongjian, vols. 207, 208.
