= Huan Yanfan =

Official of Chinese Tang and Wu Zhou dynasty

Huan Yanfan (桓彥範) (653–706), courtesy name Shize (士則), formally Prince Zhonglie of Fuyang (扶陽忠烈王), briefly known during the reign of Emperor Zhongzong of Tang as Wei Yanfan (韋彥範), was an official of the Chinese Tang dynasty and Wu Zetian's Zhou dynasty, serving as chancellor during the reign of Emperor Zhongzong. He was a key figure in the coup (Shenlong Coup) that overthrew Wu Zetian and restored Emperor Zhongzong in 705, but was later exiled due to false accusations instigated by Wu Zetian's nephew Wu Sansi and killed in exile in a cruel manner.

== Background ==
Huan Yanfan was born in 653. His family was from Run Prefecture (潤州, roughly modern Zhenjiang, Jiangsu) and traced its ancestry to the Jin dynasty (266–420) general Huan Chong. His grandfather Huan Fasi (桓法嗣) and father Huan Simin (桓思敏) both served as officials during Tang dynasty, and on account of this heritage, Huan Yanfan was made an officer of the imperial guards when he was young. It was said that he was generous and expressive.

== During Wu Zetian's reign ==
Early in the Shengli era (697–700)—when the ruling sovereign was Wu Zetian, the wife of Emperor Gaozong, who had seized the throne in 690 and taken the title of "emperor" of a new Zhou dynasty, interrupting Tang—Huan Yanfan became Sixingsi Zhubu (司刑寺主簿), the secretary general at the supreme court (司刑寺, Sixingsi). The chancellor Di Renjie was impressed by his talent and showed him respect. Huan was eventually made an imperial censor.

In 704, Huan was made the assistant chief judge of the supreme court (司刑少卿, Sixing Shaoqing). At that time, Wu Zetian's lover Zhang Changzong was accused of allowing the fortuneteller Li Hongtai (李弘泰) to prophesy that Zhang would be emperor one day. The censor Song Jing advocated that Zhang be arrested, a suggestion that Wu Zetian rejected. At Huan's further urging, Wu Zetian allowed Song to investigate, although she soon ordered the investigation terminated. Meanwhile, at that time, the chancellor Li Jiao advocated that the people who suffered at the hands of Wu Zetian's secret police officials, whom she entrusted with great power early in her reign, be restored in their reputation, a suggestion that Wu Zetian initially tabled, but after Huan suggested a compromise—that such restoration be limited to persons other than those accused of being involved in three military rebellions against her (those started by Li Jingye the Duke of Ying, Li Chong the Prince of Langye, and Li Zhen the Prince of Yue—Wu Zetian approved the proposal.

In spring 705, with Wu Zetian being ill, Huan entered into a plot with a number of officials and generals, including Zhang Jianzhi, Cui Xuanwei, Jing Hui, and Yuan Shuji, to kill Zhang Changzong and his brother Zhang Yizhi, also a lover of Wu Zetian's. Before proceeding, Huan reported this to his mother, and his mother, approving his involvement in the plot, told him, "Where loyalty and filial piety cannot both be satisfied, you should first be faithful to the empire before your obligations to your family." With agreement from Li Xian the Crown Prince (Wu Zetian's son and former emperor), they acted on February 20, killing Zhang Yizhi and Zhang Changzong, and then surrounding Wu Zetian. Wu Zetian ordered Li Xian to return to the crown prince's palace, stating, "It is you. Since now the hoodlums [(i.e., the Zhang brothers, whom the coup leaders were claiming to have designs on the throne)] have died, you can return to the Eastern Palace." However, Huan stepped forward and spoke:

How can the Crown Prince return to the Eastern Palace? Previously, the Heavenly Emperor [(i.e., Emperor Gaozong)] entrusted his beloved song to Your Imperial Majesty. Now he is mature and had long resided at the Eastern Palace. Both the heaven and the people miss the Li clan, and the officials in the government have not forgotten the grace of Emperor Taizong and the Heavenly Emperor. Therefore, we have supported the Crown Prince in the killing of the treacherous ones. We wish that Your Imperial Majesty would pass the throne to the Crown Prince to satisfy the wishes of both heaven and the people.

Wu Zetian did not speak further after that. While the coup leaders allowed her to retain the title of "emperor," they had her put under house arrest at the secondary palace Shangyang Palace (上陽宮) and forced her to yield the throne to Li Xian, who was formerly emperor, and he was restored to the throne (as Emperor Zhongzong). Two days later, Emperor Zhongzong was formally restored.

== During Emperor Zhongzong's second reign ==
Huan Yanfan, along with Zhang Jianzhi, Cui Xuanwei, Jing Hui, and Yuan Shuji, were recognized as leaders in Emperor Zhongzong's restoration, and they were put into key positions and created dukes, with Huan becoming Nayan (納言)—the head of the examination bureau of government (鸞臺, Luantai), and carrying the title of Duke of Qiao. He and the other coup leaders instituted a regime of restoring Tang institutions and deprecating Zhou ones, and when fellow chancellor Yao Yuanzhi displayed distress at Wu Zetian's removal to Shangyang Palace, Zhang and Huan had him demoted out of the capital. (One of the coup participants, Xue Jichang (薛季昶), had advocated to Zhang Jianzhi and Jing the killing of Wu Zetian's nephew Wu Sansi the Prince of Liang in the aftermaths of the killing of Zhang Yizhi and Zhang Changzong, but neither Zhang Jianzhi nor Jing paid Xue's suggestion much heed until it was too late; in fact, Jing argued hard against the killing of the Wus, even though another subordinate, Liu Youqiu, also advocated for the Wus' death and unsuccessfully tried to convince Jing and Huan.) Subsequently, alarmed about the rise of the power of Empress Wei, who carried on an affair with Wu Sansi, as well as that of the monk Huifan (慧範), Huan submitted petitions requesting that Empress Wei's power be curbed and that Huifan be executed. Emperor Zhongzong paid him no heed. When Emperor Zhongzong gave high offices to the sorcerers Zheng Pusi (鄭普思) and Ye Jingneng (葉靜能), Huan again opposed to no avail.

In summer 705, by which time Emperor Zhongzong's trust in Huan and his colleagues had completely been lost, Emperor Zhongzong, following Wu Sansi's recommendation, created the five coup leaders princes—in Huan's case, Prince of Fuyang—but stripped them of chancellor positions. He also bestowed on Huan the surname of Wei, making him a member of Empress Wei's clan. In spring 706, Jing was further sent out of Chang'an, which was now capital again, to serve as the prefect of Ming Prefecture (洺州, in modern Handan, Hebei).

Later in spring 706, with all five of the coup leaders already out of the capital, Wu Sansi and Empress Wei made accusations against them, and they were demoted to more remote prefectures—in Huan's case, to be the prefect of Bo Prefecture (亳州, roughly modern Bozhou, Anhui). Wu Sansi then had his strategist Zheng Yin further accuse the five of them of having participated in the plot of Emperor Zhongzong's son-in-law Wang Tongjiao (王同皎)—who was executed early in 706 after having been accused of plotting to kill Wu Sansi and deposing Empress Wei. The five were further demoted with the provisions that they would never be allowed to return to the capital Chang'an, with Huan becoming the military advisor to the prefect of Long Prefecture (瀧州, roughly modern Yunfu, Guangdong) and stripped of his surname of Wei. Wu Sansi then had accusations that Empress Wei was having affairs posted publicly in Luoyang, with the intent of incensing Emperor Zhongzong—and then accused the five coup leaders of being behind this public humiliation. He then had his associates propose that the five be killed. Emperor Zhongzong, citing that the five had been previously awarded iron certificates that guaranteed that they would not be executed in recognition of their contribution, ordered that they be reduced to commoner rank and permanently exiled to the Lingnan region with their families—in Huan's case, to Rang Prefecture (瀼州, roughly modern Chongzuo, Guangxi). At the suggestion of Cui Shi, Wu Sansi then sent the censor Zhou Lizhen (周利貞) to the Lingnan region under guise of reviewing the affairs of the region but with instructions to kill the five. When Zhou encountered Huan at Gui Prefecture (貴州, roughly modern Guigang, Guangxi), he had Huan bound and then slid over sharpened bamboo roots, tearing Huan's flesh off until bones were showing; he then caned Huan to death. After Emperor Zhongzong's death in 710 and Emperor Zhongzong's brother Li Dan the Prince of Xiang, himself a former emperor, was restored (as Emperor Ruizong), Huan and his colleagues were posthumously honored.

== Notes and references ==
- Old Book of Tang, vol. 91.
- New Book of Tang, vol. 120.
- Zizhi Tongjian, vols. 207, 208.
