= Cui Xuanwei =

Official of the Wu Zhou dynasty (638-706)

Cui Xuanwei (Chinese: 崔玄暐; 638–706), né Cui Ye (崔曄), posthumous name Prince Wenxian of Boling (博陵文獻王), was an official of China's Tang dynasty and Wu Zhou dynasty, serving as a chancellor during the reigns of Wu Zetian and her son Emperor Zhongzong. He was a key figure in the coup (Shenlong Coup) that overthrew Wu Zetian and restored Emperor Zhongzong in 705. He was later exiled due to false accusations instigated by Wu Zetian's nephew Wu Sansi and died in exile.

== Background ==
Cui Chu was born late in the reign of Emperor Taizong. He was from "the elder house of Boling" of the prominent Cui clan of Boling. His father Cui Xingjin (崔行謹) served as the magistrate of Husu County (胡蘇, in modern Dezhou, Shandong), and his uncle Cui Xinggong (崔行功) was the head of the Palace Library. During the Longshuo era of Emperor Taizong's son Emperor Gaozong, he passed the imperial examinations and became a low-level official at the ministry of treasury (庫部, Kubu). His mother Lady Lu often encouraged him to be an honest and clean official. He heeded his mother's teachings and became known for his honesty and carefulness. At some point, because the character of his name Ye (曄) apparently had a similar appearance to the name of one of the ancestors of Emperor Gaozong's wife Empress Wu (later known as Wu Zetian), he changed his name to Xuanwei. He eventually served as a Fengge Sheren (鳳閣舍人), a mid-level official at the legislative bureau of government (鳳閣, Fengge).

== During Wu Zetian's reign ==
In 701, by which time Empress Wu had taken the throne herself as "emperor" of a new Zhou dynasty, interrupting Tang dynasty, Cui Xuanwei was made the deputy minister of civil service affairs (天官侍郎, Tianguan Shilang), and he was said to be upright and not susceptible to improper influence by powerful people. Later that year, he was made Wenchang Zuo Cheng (文昌左丞), one of the secretaries general of the executive bureau (文昌臺, Wenchang Tai). A month later, Wu Zetian summoned him and told him, "Since your office was changed, I heard that the officials often feasted because they could now again be corrupt. I will put you back in your old position." She thus made him deputy minister of civil service again and gave him an award of silk.

In 704, when Cui was still serving as deputy minister of civil service affairs, he was given the designation Tong Fengge Luantai Pingzhangshi (同鳳閣鸞臺平章事), making him a chancellor de facto. By late that year, when Wu Zetian was ill and was often attended only by her lovers Zhang Yizhi and Zhang Changzong, Cui made the suggestion to her that she should have her sons Li Xian the Crown Prince and Li Dan the Prince of Xiang attend to her—not members of other clans (i.e., not the Zhang brothers). Wu Zetian, while thanking him for his input, paid no heed. Cui later supported the imperial censor Song Jing in Song's attempt to investigate Zhang Changzong for corruption and plotting treason, but Wu Zetian did not permit the investigation. She did, however, approve a petition jointly submitted by him and Li Jiao and supported by Huan Yanfan that the people who were found guilty and executed due to accusations by her secret police officials (such as Zhou Xing and Lai Junchen) early in her reign be posthumously restored to honor.

In spring 705, with Wu Zetian continuing to be ill, Cui entered into a plot with a number of officials and generals, including Zhang Jianzhi, Huan, Jing Hui, and Yuan Shuji, to kill the Zhang brothers. With agreement from Li Xian, they acted on February 20, killing Zhang Yizhi and Zhang Changzong, and then surrounding Wu Zetian. While they allowed her to retain the title of "emperor," they had her put under house arrest at the secondary palace Shangyang Palace (上陽宮) and forced her to yield the throne to Li Xian, who was formerly emperor, and he was restored to the throne (as Emperor Zhongzong). As she confronted the plotters, she said to Cui, "All of the others became key officials because of others' recommendations. Only you were personally selected by myself, and yet you stand here with them." Cui responded, "What I do today is to repay your Imperial Majesty's great grace to me."

== During Emperor Zhongzong's second reign ==
Cui Xuanwei, along with Zhang Jianzhi, Huan Yanfan, Jing Hui, and Yuan Shuji, were recognized as leaders in Emperor Zhongzong's restoration, and they were put into key positions and created dukes, with Cui becoming Neishi (內史), the head of the legislative bureau and one of the posts considered one for a chancellor, and carrying the title of Duke of Boling. Soon, however, Emperor Zhongzong became heavily and deeply influenced by his powerful wife Empress Wei and her lover Wu Sansi the Prince of Liang (Wu Zetian's nephew and Emperor Zhongzong's cousin). Zhang fervently argued against the rise of Wu Sansi's power but was unable to do anything about it. Further, when Emperor Zhongzong also became trusting of sorcerers Zheng Pusi (鄭普思) and Ye Jingneng (葉靜能) and wanted to give Zheng and Ye honored positions, Cui and Huan spoke against it but was not listened to. In summer 705, by which time Emperor Zhongzong's trust in Cui and his colleagues had completely been lost, Emperor Zhongzong, following Wu Sansi's recommendation, created the five coup leaders princes—in Cui's case, Prince of Boling—but stripped them of chancellor positions. Cui was soon made the secretary general of Yi Prefecture (益州, roughly modern Chengdu, Sichuan) and acting commandant at Yi Prefecture.

In spring 706, with all five of the coup leaders already out of the capital, Wu Sansi and Empress Wei made accusations against them, and they were demoted to more remote prefectures—in Cui's case, to be the prefect of Jun Prefecture (均州, roughly modern Shiyan, Hubei). Wu Sansi then had his strategist Zheng Yin further accuse the five of them of having participated in the plot of Emperor Zhongzong's son-in-law Wang Tongjiao (王同皎) -- who was executed early in 706 after having been accused of plotting to kill Wu Sansi and deposing Empress Wei. The five were further demoted with the provisions that they would never be allowed to return to the capital Chang'an, with Cui becoming the military advisor to the prefect of Bai Prefecture (白州, roughly modern Yulin, Guangxi). Wu Sansi then had accusations that Empress Wei was having affairs posted publicly in the eastern capital Luoyang, with the intent of incensing Emperor Zhongzong—and then accused the five coup leaders of being behind this public humiliation. He then had his associates propose that the five be killed. Emperor Zhongzong, citing that the five had been previously awarded iron certificates that guaranteed that they would not be executed in recognition of their contribution, ordered that they be reduced to commoner rank and permanently exiled to the Lingnan region with their families—in Cui's case, to Gu Prefecture (古州, roughly modern Lạng Sơn Province, Vietnam). At the suggestion of Cui Shi, Wu Sansi then sent the censor Zhou Lizhen (周利貞) to the Lingnan region under guise of reviewing the affairs of the region but with instructions to kill the five. By the time that Zhou reached the region, though, Cui Xuanwei had already died. After Emperor Zhongzong's death in 710 and Li Dan, himself a former emperor, was restored (as Emperor Ruizong), Cui and his colleagues were posthumously honored, and his son Cui Qu (崔璩) received the title of Duke of Boling.

== Notes and references ==
- Old Book of Tang, vol. 91.
- Zizhi Tongjian, vols. 207, 208.
