= Zhang Yizhi and Zhang Changzong =

Chinese officials under Wu Zetian (died 705)

Zhang Yizhi (張易之; died 20 February 705), formally the Duke of Heng (恆公), nickname Wulang (五郎) and Zhang Changzong (張昌宗; died 20 February 705), formally the Duke of Ye (鄴公), nickname Liulang (六郎), were two brothers who served as officials of Wu Zetian's Wu Zhou dynasty and became very powerful late in her reign. Both brothers were killed in a coup that overthrew Wu Zetian in 705.

== Background ==
It is not known when Zhang Yizhi and Zhang Changzong were born. It is known that their father Zhang Xizang (張希臧) had, at one point, served as the census officer of the Tang dynasty's capital prefecture Yong Prefecture (雍州, roughly modern Xi'an, Shaanxi) and was a distant nephew of the chancellor Zhang Xingcheng. Their mother might be Lady Wei or Lady Zang. (Note: Both the New Book of Tang and the Zizhi Tongjian stated that Zhang Changzong and Zhang Yizhi had different mothers -- with one of them being Lady Wei and one of them being Lady Zang, without specifying which mother gave birth to which son. However, the Old Book of Tang indicated that they were born of a single mother -- a Lady Wei Azang (韋阿臧). Compare Old Book of Tang, vol. 78 (zh:s:舊唐書/卷78), with New Book of Tang, vol.104 (zh:s:新唐書/卷104) and Zizhi Tongjian, vol. 206. It is not clear which interpretation is correct.)

As per Tang regulations, Zhang Yizhi, as the son of an official, was able to get into a civil service career himself in his 20s, serving as the imperial director of horses (尚乘奉御, Shangcheng Fengyu). It was said that his skin at that time was white and beautiful and that he was good at singing.

== As Wu Zetian's lovers ==
In 697, Zhang Changzong was referred to Wu Zetian, then ruling with the title of emperor—the only woman in the history of China recognized for doing so—by Wu Zetian's daughter Princess Taiping, to be Wu Zetian's lover. Zhang Changzong further told Wu Zetian that Zhang Yizhi was even more skillful than he was, and so Wu Zetian took Zhang Yizhi as a lover as well. Both were repeatedly promoted—Zhang Yizhi as the deputy minister of military supplies (司衛少卿, Siwei Shaoqing)—and both were said to often put makeup on their faces and dressing in a beautiful manner. Their mother or mothers were given titles as grand ladies and Wu Zetian further ordered the chancellor Li Jiongxiu to serve as the lover for one of their mothers. (Note: As stated above, it is not clear whether Zhang Yizhi and Zhang Changzong had the same mother or not. The New Book of Tang and the Zizhi Tongjian, adopting the two-mother interpretation, stated Li Jiongxiu was Lady Zang's lover, while the Old Book of Tang stated that Li Jiongxiu was Lady Wei Azang's lover.) Even the most powerful officials flattered them, and referred them by endearing nicknames—Zhang Yizhi as Wulang and Zhang Changzong as Liulang (implying that Zhang Yizhi was the fifth-born son and Zhang Changzong was the sixth-born son of Zhang Xizang).

In 698, Zhang Yizhi and Zhang Changzong were involved in the recall from exile of Wu Zetian's son Li Zhe the Prince of Luling, who had briefly been emperor in 684. The Zhangs' colleague as imperial attendant, Ji Xu, had persuaded them that they were becoming objects of hatred due to the favor that Wu Zetian had shown for them and that if they advocated Li Zhe's return and installation as crown prince, they would be able to maintain their power. The Zhangs agreed and advocated Li Zhe's return to Wu Zetian, who subsequently recalled Li Zhe from exile and made him crown prince.

In 699, Zhang Yizhi was made the director of imperial attendants (控鶴監, Konghe Jian), overseeing a group of imperial attendants, including Zhang Changzong, Ji, Tian Guidao (田歸道), Li Jiongxiu, Xue Ji and Yuan Banqian (員半千).

In 700, Zhang Yizhi was on one occasion offended by the official Yang Yuanxi (楊元禧)—a grandnephew of the Sui dynasty chancellor Yang Su, who had been believed to be involved with Emperor Yang of Sui in killing Emperor Yang's father Emperor Wen of Sui. Zhang Yizhi retaliated against Yang Yuanxi by arguing to Wu Zetian that family members of Yang Su should not be allowed to serve in the capital, and Wu Zetian agreed, demoting Yang Yuanxi and his brother Yang Yuanheng (楊元亨) out of the capital Luoyang.

Also in 700, in order to somewhat shield her relationship with the Zhangs from the public eye, Wu Zetian commissioned them and the imperial scholar Li Jiao to compile a work known as the Essence of Pearls from the Three Religions (三教珠英, Sanjiao Zhuying)—a compilation of various poetry about Confucianism, Buddhism, and Taoism—to give the Zhangs a legitimate reason to enter the palace.

By 701, Wu Zetian, then 76 years old, had been largely entrusting the affairs of state to Zhang Yizhi and Zhang Changzong—a situation that her grandson Li Chongrun (son of Li Zhe, who had by now changed his name to Xian) disapproved and had discussed with his sister Li Xianhui (Princess Yongtai) and Li Xianhui's husband, Wu Zetian's grandnephew Wu Yanji (武延基) the Prince of Wei. When the Zhangs became aware of the conversation, they reported this to Wu Zetian, who saw this discussion as an implicit criticism of herself, and she ordered Li Chongrun, Li Xianhui, and Wu Yanji to commit suicide. (Note: The Zizhi Tongjian asserted that Li Chongrun was forced to commit suicide, but the Old Book of Tang and the New Book of Tang asserted in his biographies that he was caned to death on Wu Zetian's orders. Compare Zizhi Tongjian, vol. 207, with Old Book of Tang, vol. 86 (zh:s:舊唐書/卷86) and New Book of Tang, vol. 81 (zh:s:新唐書/卷081). The Old Book of Tang, meanwhile, inconsistently asserted in the chronicles of Wu Zetian's reign that he was forced to commit suicide. See Old Book of Tang, vol. 6 (zh:s:舊唐書/卷6). The chronicles of Wu Zetian's reign in the New Book of Tang merely stated that the three of them "were killed." See New Book of Tang, vol. 4 (zh:s:新唐書/卷004).) (Note: However, some modern historians, based on the text on Li Xianhui's tombstone (written after Emperor Zhongzong was restored to the throne in 705), which suggested that she died the day after her brother and her husband and that she was pregnant at death, and the fact that the skeleton believed to be hers had a small pelvis, have proposed the theory that she was not ordered to commit suicide, but had, in grief over her brother's and husband's deaths, had either a miscarriage or a difficult birth and died from that. See, e.g., illustrations preceding the Bo Yang Edition of the Zizhi Tongjian, vol. 49, and Da Tang Yongtai Gongzhu Zhi (zh:s:大唐永泰公主誌).)

In 702, Wu Zetian induced Li Zhe, his younger brother Li Dan the Prince of Xiang, and Princess Taiping to submit formal petitions to create Zhang Changzong a prince. Wu Zetian formally rejected the petitions, but then created Zhang Changzong the Duke of Ye and Zhang Yizhi the Duke of Heng.

By 703, the Zhangs were displeased with the chancellor Wei Yuanzhong, as Wei had repeatedly rebuffed the promotion of their brother Zhang Changqi (張昌期) and had publicly humiliated another brother, Zhang Changyi (張昌儀). When Wu Zetian suffered a minor illness, the Zhangs became concerned that if Wu Zetian had died, they would be killed by Wei, and therefore falsely accused Wei and a favorite of Princess Taiping, Gao Jian (高戩), of having speculated about Wu Zetian's death.

They persuaded the official Zhang Shuo to falsely corroborate the accusations against Wei, although, once Zhang Shuo was brought into Wu Zetian's presence, he not only recanted the accusation against Wei but further accused the Zhangs of suborning perjury from him. As a result, Wei, Gao, and Zhang Shuo were all exiled, but none of the three suffered death. Zhang Yizhi further accused eight people who held a send-off feast for Wei of treason, but was not successful in getting the eight men executed.

In 704, Zhang Yizhi was accused of corruption, and as a result of the investigation, Zhang Changyi and another brother, Zhang Tongxiu (張同休), were removed from their offices. The imperial censor Song Jing, who had long resented the Zhangs, volunteered to investigate Zhang Yizhi and Zhang Changzong, and Wu Zetian publicly agreed, but then sent Song out of the capital to investigate Qutu Zhongxiang (屈突仲翔) the commandant at You Prefecture (幽州, roughly modern Beijing), giving the case instead to the minister of ceremonies, Cui Shenqing (崔神慶), who knew that she wanted them spared, and therefore cleared them.

== Death ==
By early 705, Wu Zetian was seriously ill, and the chancellor Zhang Jianzhi, believing that the Zhangs' power threatened Li Xian's succession, entered into a coup plot with the other officials Cui Xuanwei, Jing Hui, Huan Yanfan, and Yuan Shuji. They rose on February 20 and went to see Li Xian. After receiving his assent, took their forces into the palace and killed Zhang Yizhi and Zhang Changzong at Yingxian Courtyard (迎仙院).

Their brothers Zhang Changqi, Zhang Tongxiu, and Zhang Changyi were also killed, and the five men's heads were hung at Tianjin Bridge (天津橋), one of the entries to Luoyang. The officials then forced Wu Zetian to yield the throne to Li Xian (as Emperor Zhongzong), ending the Zhou dynasty and restoring the Tang dynasty.

In 750, during the reign of Wu Zetian's grandson Emperor Xuanzong, Zhang Changqi's daughter submitted a petition defending her father and uncles. With assistance by her cousin, the chancellor Yang Guozhong (whose mother was a sister of the Zhang brothers'), (Note: However, a story recorded in the Tianbao Tales (天寶故事) by Zheng Shen claimed that Yang Guozhong was actually a son of Zhang Yizhi's, with the servant girl Binzhu (蠙珠), but given to his sister to raise to avoid punishment from the jealous Wu Zetian. See Bo Yang Edition of the Zizhi Tongjian, vol. 52 [750]. In his Zizhi Tongjian Kaoyi, Sima Guang opinioned that the story was a baseless rumour and so he did not include it in Tongjian.) her petition was accepted by Emperor Xuanzong, and he posthumously restored the Zhang brothers' titles.
