= Shangguan Wan'er (TV series) =

- DVD cover art
- Traditional Chinese: 上官婉兒
- Simplified Chinese: 上官婉儿
- Hanyu Pinyin: Shàngguān Wǎn'ér
- Genre: Historical drama
- Screenplay by: Ning Yegao; Ning Yelong; Ning Yun; Fang Tianmin
- Directed by: Gong Yiqun; Liu Guonan; Wang Haoying
- Presented by: Cui Qiang; Cui Yiping; Liu Yanming
- Starring: Ruan Danning; Huang Haibing; Zhang Qing
- Theme music composer: Fu Zhang
- Opening theme: Ren Shijian (人世间) performed by Tu Meihua
- Ending theme: Mengxing (梦醒) performed by Li Hong
- Composer: Fu Zhang
- Country of origin: China
- Original language: Mandarin
- No. of episodes: 30

Production
- Executive producers: Li Peisen; Wang Qiu; Ma Runsheng; Qiu Zhijun; Zhang Haibo
- Producers: Zeng Rihua; Zheng Suixu; Qu Chenggen; Wang Ning
- Production location: China
- Cinematography: Du Xiaosi; Wang Weidong
- Running time: 48 minutes per episode
- Production companies: Phoenix Television; China International Television Corporation; Hairun International Commercials

Shangguan Wan'er is a Chinese television series based on the life of Shangguan Wan'er, a female official in the court of Wu Zetian, the only female emperor in Chinese history. Starring Ruan Danning as the titular character, the series was first aired in mainland China in December 1998. The series was broadcast again in March 2003 on Sichuan Satellite TV.

== Plot ==
Shangguan Wan'er was the granddaughter of Shangguan Yi, a government official. After Shangguan Yi tried to depose Empress Wu, his whole family was executed except for Wan'er and her mother, Lady Zheng. They were protected by another official named Pei Yan.

At the age of 15, Wan'er entered the Imperial Palace to become the study mate of the Crown Prince, Li Xian. They developed feelings for each other despite their backgrounds. However, Li Xian's beliefs contrasted from his mother's beliefs. Li Xian was deposed from his position as Crown Prince and was sentenced to death. Wan'er decides to find the truth and appeals to Empress Wu. Empress Wu is regretful and makes Wan'er her secretary. She was titled the world's number one lady.

Even after all those years, Wan'er never forgot Li Xian. She kept his words at heart, and helped restore peace to the Tang dynasty. Wan'er enlisted the help of Di Renjie and Princess Taiping, and together they stopped the ambitions of Wu Sansi, Wu Chengsi, and Pei Yan. She dedicates the rest of her life to the Li family, and later becomes a consort to Li Xian's brother, Li Zhe.

== Cast ==
- Ruan Danning as Shangguan Wan'er
- Zhang Qing as Wu Zetian
- Sun Yang as Princess Taiping
- Huang Haibing as Li Xian
- Ji Chenmu as Emperor Zhongzong
- Lu Shiyu as Emperor Ruizong
- Geng Yong as Empress Wei
- Fan Zhiqi as Pei Yan
- Tan Jianchang as Takashima Shin (Gaodao Xin)

== List of songs ==
- Ren Shijian (人世间), the opening theme song, performed by Tu Meihua
- Mengxing (梦醒), the ending theme song, performed by Li Hong
- Tongxin Jie (同心结), insert song, performed by Xiao Chanjuan
- Tong Shi Tianya Lunluo Ren (同是天涯沦落人), insert song, performed by Tu Meihua
