= Shangguan Wan'er =

Chinese politician, poet and concubine (664–710)

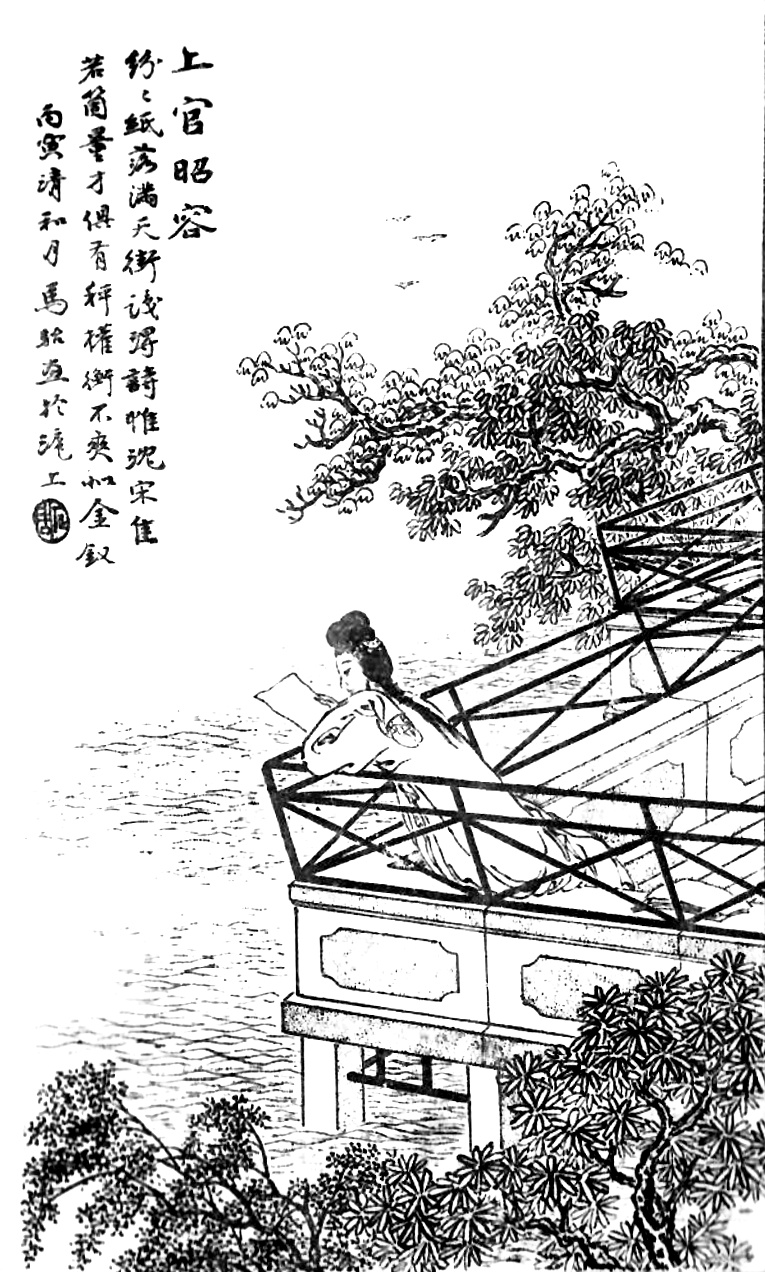
- Shangguan Wan'er, drawn by Ma Dai (马骀)
- Born: c. 664; Shan County, Shan Prefecture, Tang China
- Died: July 21, 710 (aged about 46); Chang'an, Tang China
- Spouse: Emperor Zhongzong of Tang
Names
- Shangguan Wan'er (上官婉兒)
Posthumous name
- Huiwen (惠文)
- House: House of Li (by marriage)
- Father: Shangguan Tingzhi
- Mother: Lady Zheng (elder sister of Zheng Xiuyuan)

Shangguan Wan'er
- Traditional Chinese: 上官婉兒
- Simplified Chinese: 上官婉儿
Transcriptions
Standard Mandarin
- Hanyu Pinyin: Shàngguān Wǎn'ér
- Wade–Giles: Shang-kuan Wan-erh
Yue: Cantonese
- Yale Romanization: Seuhng-gwān Yún-yìh
- Jyutping: Soeng^{6}-gun^{1} Jyun^{2}-ji^{4}
Southern Min
- Hokkien POJ: Siōng-kuan Uán-jî
Middle Chinese
- Middle Chinese: Źjang^{C}kwân Ɂjwɐn^{B}ńźje

Shangguan Wan'er (Note: While Shangguan's biographies in both Books Of Tang recorded that "Wan'er'" was her name, this name did not appear in her epitaph.) (c. 664 – July 21, 710) (Note: Historical sources indicate that Shangguan Wan'er was an infant when her grandfather Shangguan Yi and father Shangguan Tingzhi were killed in the winter of 664, implying, but not establishing with certainty, that she was born in 664. See Old Book of Tang, vol. 51 (zh:s:舊唐書/卷51), and New Book of Tang, vol. 76 (zh:s:新唐書/卷076). Shangguan's epitaph recorded that she was 47 (by East Asian reckoning) when she died.) was a Chinese politician, poet, and imperial consort of the Wu Zhou and Tang dynasties. Described as a "female prime minister," Shangguan rose from modest origins as a palace servant to become secretary and leading advisor to Empress Wu Zetian of Wu Zhou. Under Empress Wu, Shangguan exercised responsibility for drafting imperial edicts and earned approbation for her writing style. She retained her influence as consort to Wu's son and successor, Emperor Zhongzong of Tang, holding the imperial consort rank of Zhaorong (昭容). Shangguan was also highly esteemed for her talent as a poet. In 710, after Emperor Zhongzong's death, Shangguan was killed during a palace coup launched by Li Longji that ended the regency of Empress Dowager Wei.

== Childhood ==
Shangguan Wan'er's grandfather Shangguan Yi had become a prominent official early in the reign of Emperor Gaozong and had become chancellor in 662. In 664, Emperor Gaozong was angry with the very high level of controlling influence that his second wife Empress Wu (later known as Wu Zetian) was exerting over policies, disregarded the emperor's decisions, and violated the law, and he consulted Shangguan Yi, who recommended that he depose Empress Wu. However, when Empress Wu discovered this, Emperor Gaozong changed his mind and instead blamed Shangguan Yi. At Empress Wu's instigation, her ally the chancellor Xu Jingzong falsely accused Shangguan Yi of plotting with Emperor Gaozong's son Li Zhong, on whose staff Shangguan had served at one time, as well as the eunuch Wang Fusheng (王伏勝) (who had earlier reported Empress Wu's wrongdoing to Emperor Gaozong) against Emperor Gaozong. Li Zhong was forced to commit suicide, while Wang, Shangguan Yi, and Shangguan Wan'er's father Shangguan Tingzhi (上官庭芝) were put to death on January 3, 665. (Note: Shangguan Wan'er's epitaph recorded that her father and grandfather "died in fear". This is in conflict with the record found in traditional histories.) After that, Empress Wu's political power and influence was virtually unstoppable and she ruled in practice instead of her husband.

After Shangguan Yi's and Shangguan Tingzhi's deaths, Shangguan Wan'er and her mother Lady Zheng—an elder sister of the official Zheng Xiuyuan (鄭休遠) – were spared, but became slaves in the inner imperial palace. As Shangguan Wan'er grew older, she read extensively and showed a talent for writing prose and poetry at an early age, as well as in matters of civil service regulations. After Empress Wu stumbled upon poems written by the 13-year-old Shangguan Wan'er, Empress Wu summoned Shangguan Wan'er and asked her to compose an essay based on a given theme right on the spot. (Note: Shangguan's epitaph recorded that she was appointed cairen (a low-ranked consort) when she was 13 (by East Asian reckoning). At this point (c. 676), the reigning emperor was still Emperor Gaozong, who was in poor health. Perhaps more significantly, cairen was the rank Wu Zetian held during her time in the harem of Emperor Taizong of Tang.) Shangguan Wan'er performed marvelously, and the Empress was so impressed that she appointed Wan'er her personal secretary. Shangguan came to write half of all imperial decrees, and took on the task of accepting most of the proposals and petitions of officials. She was also a member of the Empress Literary Society, and oversaw the cultural and political works of Empress Wu.

== As Wu Zetian's secretary ==
After Emperor Gaozong's death in 683, Empress Wu became empress dowager and deposed, in succession, her two sons, Emperor Zhongzong and Emperor Ruizong. In 690, she took the title of "emperor" herself, abolishing the Tang dynasty and establishing her own Wu Zhou dynasty, becoming the only empress regent of all China in Chinese history. Particularly after the Wansui Tongtian era (696–697), Shangguan Wan'er, as Wu Zetian's secretary, was in charge of drafting imperial edicts, and her writing style was said to be exceedingly beautiful. On one occasion, she was supposed to be put to death after disobeying Wu Zetian's order; Wu Zetian, caring for her because of her talent, spared her, but tattooed her face. Thereafter, Wu Zetian usually consulted with her on the officials' petitions and important affairs of state.

== As imperial consort ==
In 705, a coup led by Zhang Jianzhi, Cui Xuanwei, Jing Hui, Huan Yanfan, and Yuan Shuji removed Wu Zetian and returned Emperor Zhongzong to the throne. At that time, Shangguan Wan'er became an imperial consort, as a powerful concubine of Emperor Zhongzong, carrying the rank of Jieyu (婕妤), the 14th rank for an imperial consort. (Note: It is not stated in history whether she became his concubine during his first or second reign.) Much like Empress Wu, Emperor Zhongzong put Shangguan in charge of drafting edicts and other imperial orders. However, she carried on an affair with Emperor Zhongzong's cousin and Wu Zetian's nephew Wu Sansi (武三思), the Prince of Liang; through her, Wu Sansi became a trusted advisor of Emperor Zhongzong and a lover of Emperor Zhongzong's wife Empress Wei as well. (Note: As a result, Zhang and his cohorts soon lost power and died or were killed in exile.) Subsequently, at her suggestion to Empress Wei for the latter to emulate Wu Zetian, Empress Wei submitted formal proposals to Emperor Zhongzong to require the people to observe three-year mourning periods for their mothers who had been divorced by their fathers, (Note: Previously, such a mourning period was not required for a divorced mother.) and reducing the period where a man was considered an adult male (and therefore subject to military and labor conscription) from the ages to 20 to 59, to the ages of 22 to 58, in order to try to gain the people's gratitude. Emperor Zhongzong approved the proposals.

Meanwhile, in addition to Empress Wei and Consort Shangguan, Empress Wei's daughter Li Guo'er (李裹兒), the Princess Anle, became very powerful as well, as she was Emperor Zhongzong's favorite daughter, and she had married Wu Sansi's son Wu Chongxun (武崇訓). She often humiliated her brother Li Chongjun (李重俊) the Crown Prince on account that Li Chongjun was not born of Empress Wei, at times calling him "slave." She also often suggested to Emperor Zhongzong that he depose Li Chongjun and make her crown princess. In summer 707, Li Chongjun's anger erupted, and he, along with the ethnically Mohe general Li Duozuo (李多祚) and Emperor Zhongzong's cousin Li Qianli (李千里) the Prince of Cheng, rose in rebellion, first killing Wu Sansi and Wu Chongxun. He then attacked the palace, seeking to arrest Consort Shangguan. Consort Shangguan, Empress Wei, Li Guo'er, and Emperor Zhongzong were protected by the imperial guards, and when Li Chongjun hesitated at what to do next, his forces collapsed, and he and his cohorts were killed.

Meanwhile, Consort Shangguan's nephew Wang Yu (王昱) had been warning her, through her mother Lady Zheng, that her continued behavior in working with the Wus and Empress Wei would eventually bring disaster on her and her clan. Consort Shangguan initially took no heed, but after Li Chongjun had demanded, by name, to arrest her during the 707 coup attempt, she became fearful, and she began to distance herself from Li Guo'er and Empress Wei, aligning herself more with Emperor Zhongzong's sister Princess Taiping. Despite this, she and her mother Lady Zheng, along with Li Guo'er, Empress Wei, the senior ladies in waiting Ladies Chai and Helou, the sorceress Diwu Ying'er (第五英兒), and Lady Zhao of Longxi, were described by contemporaries as powerful and corrupt women at court, selling governmental offices at will. Consort Shangguan and the other imperial consorts were also said to, against regulations, establish mansions outside the palace.

In 708, Emperor Zhongzong established an imperial academy, with four imperial scholars, eight assistant scholars, and 12 associate scholars, selecting officials with literary talent to serve as the imperial scholars. He often held feasts that would also serve as literary competitions, and he had Consort Shangguan serve as the judge at these competitions. Late in the year, he promoted her to the rank of Zhaorong, the sixth rank among imperial consorts. In addition to writing poems in her own name, she was also said to have written poems in the names of Emperor Zhongzong, Empress Wei, Li Guo'er, and Li Guo'er's sister Princess Changning. The poems were said to be beautiful and often recited by people who heard them.

By spring 709, Consort Shangguan was having an affair with the official Cui Shi (崔湜) and on account of that relationship, she recommended him to be a chancellor. Emperor Zhongzong agreed. By summer, however, Cui and another chancellor, Zheng Yin (鄭愔), were charged with corruption. As a result, Cui was exiled to be the military advisor to the prefect of Jiang Prefecture (江州, roughly modern Jiujiang, Jiangxi). However, Consort Shangguan, Li Guo'er, and Li Guo'er's new husband Wu Yanxiu (武延秀) then spoke on his behalf secretly, and Emperor Zhongzong instead made Cui the prefect of Xiang Prefecture (襄州, roughly modern Xiangfan, Hubei). (Note: Zheng, who had been set to be reduced to commoner rank and exiled to Ji Prefecture (吉州, roughly modern Ji'an, Jiangxi), was instead made the military advisor to the prefect of Jiang Prefecture.)

== Death ==
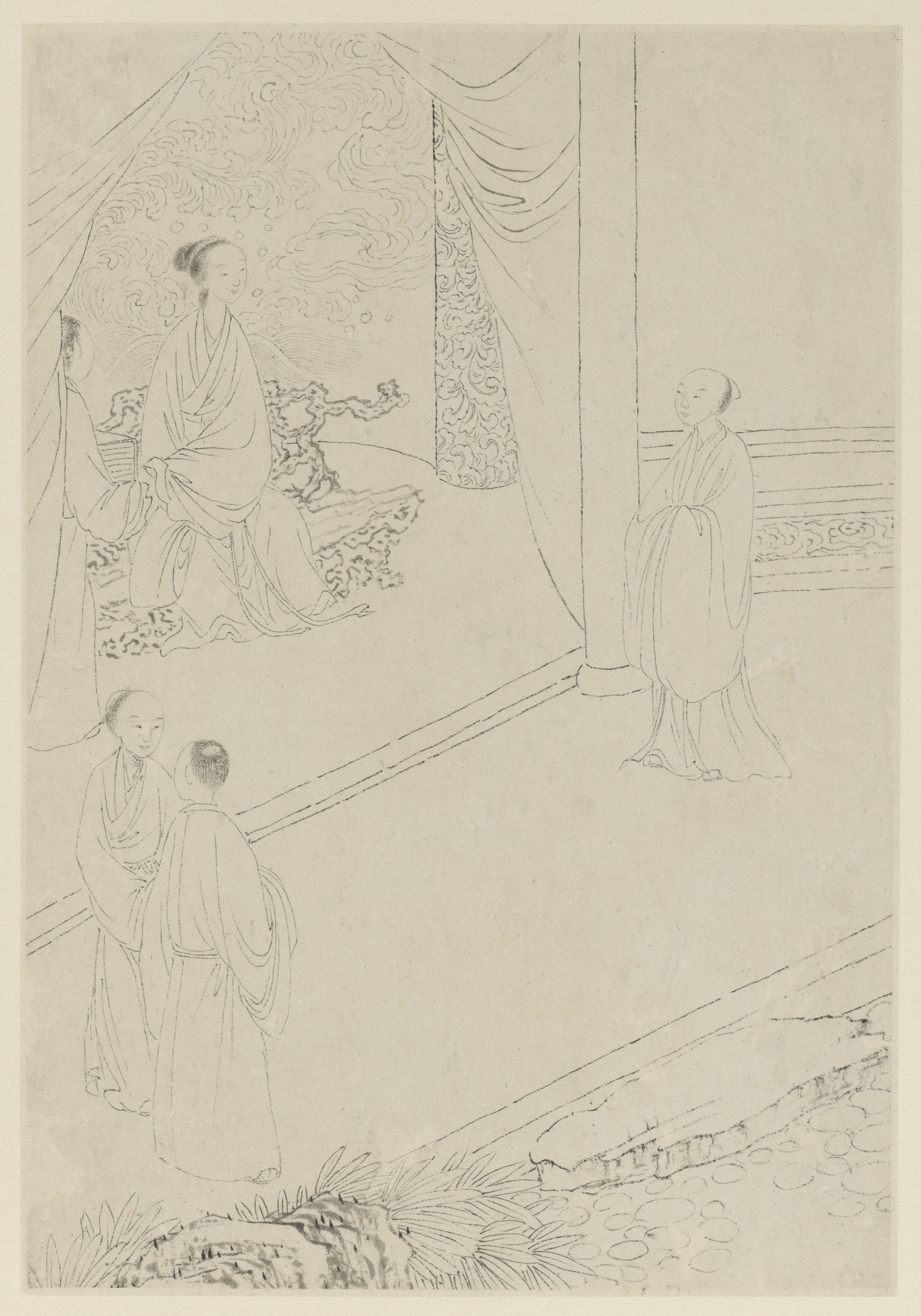
As depicted in the album Famous Women (1799)

In fall 710, Emperor Zhongzong died suddenly—a death that traditional historians assert to be a poisoning carried out by Empress Wei and Li Guo'er, to allow Empress Wei to seize power and eventually take the throne and Li Guo'er to become crown princess. In the aftermath of Emperor Zhongzong's death, Empress Wei, who initially kept the death secret, tried to consolidate power; she immediately ordered that the palace and the capital be sealed. All the gates were blockaded and exit of the capital forbidden. Days later, Empress Wei and Princess Anle proclaimed a new Emperor, a teenager no more than 11, as the new Emperor of Tang. Immediately, rumours spread that the Emperor had died because of poison. Consort Shangguan and Princess Taiping were consulting each other in drafting a posthumous will for Emperor Zhongzong. Under their plan, Emperor Zhongzong's youngest son Li Chongmao the Prince of Wen would inherit the throne and he had absolute power; Empress Wei would serve as empress dowager and regent, assisted by Li Dan, the Prince of Xiang (the former Emperor Ruizong). Once the will was promulgated, however, two chancellors closely aligned with Empress Wei—her cousin Wei Wen and Zong Chuke—objected and ordered the will revised, and Empress Dowager Wei became sole regent for Li Chongmao (now Emperor Shang), without participation by Li Dan in the regency; because of the ruling power of the now Empress Dowager Wei, the absolute power of the young emperor was abolished.

Meanwhile, Zong, Wu Yanxiu, and other officials Zhao Lüwen (趙履溫) and Ye Jingneng (葉靜能), were advocating to Empress Dowager Wei that she take the throne. They also believed that Li Dan and Princess Taiping were in the way and should be removed. The official Cui Riyong leaked their plans to Li Dan's son Li Longji (李隆基) the Prince of Linzi, and Li Longji quickly formed a plan with Princess Taiping and her son Xue Chongjian (薛崇簡) to act first. Less than a month after Emperor Zhongzong's death, they launched a coup, quickly killing Empress Wei, Li Guo'er, and Empress Wei's clan members. When Li Longji's soldiers, commanded by his associate Liu Youqiu, reached the pavilion where Consort Shangguan lived, Consort Shangguan came out of the pavilion to greet Liu and Li Longji, presenting to them the original will of Emperor Zhongzong that she had drafted, seeking to be spared. Li Longji refused to spare her, however, and she was dragged out and beheaded.

== Posthumous recognition ==
Soon, under the suggestion by Princess Taiping, Li Longji, and Li Longji's brother Li Chengqi the Prince of Song, Emperor Shang was removed from the throne, and Li Dan took the throne again. On September 7, 711, he restored Consort Shangguan's title as Zhaorong, (Note: Shangguan's epitaph recorded that she petitioned Emperor Zhongzong to demote herself to the rank of jieyu; this was granted after several attempts. The original title of her epitaph (大唐故婕妤上官氏墓志铭) implied that she was buried with rites accorded to a jieyu. This record is in conflict with the one found in her biography in New Book of Tang, where she asked to be demoted to jieyu due to her mother Lady Zheng's death. Emperor Zhongzong agreed to her request, but restored her rank of zhaorong soon after. The original title of her epitaph is also in conflict with the inscription found on the epitaph lid.) and gave her the posthumous name of Huiwen (惠文, meaning "benevolent and civil"). Sometime after, Emperor Ruizong yielded the throne to Li Longji, who took the throne as Emperor Xuanzong. Princess Taiping posthumously had Consort Shangguan's works collected into a 20-volume collection, and had the chancellor Zhang Yue (張悅) write the preface to the collection.

== Tomb ==
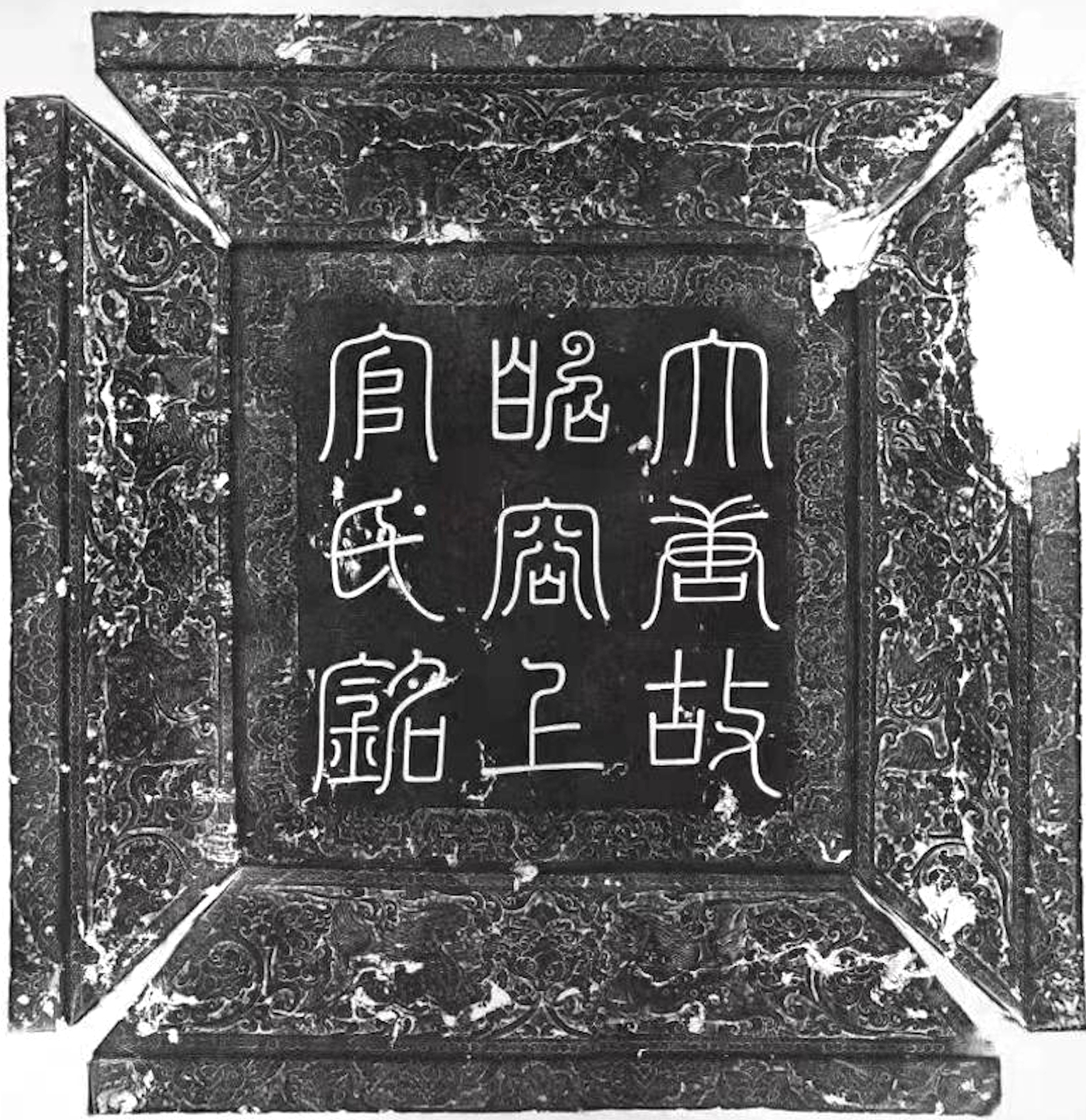
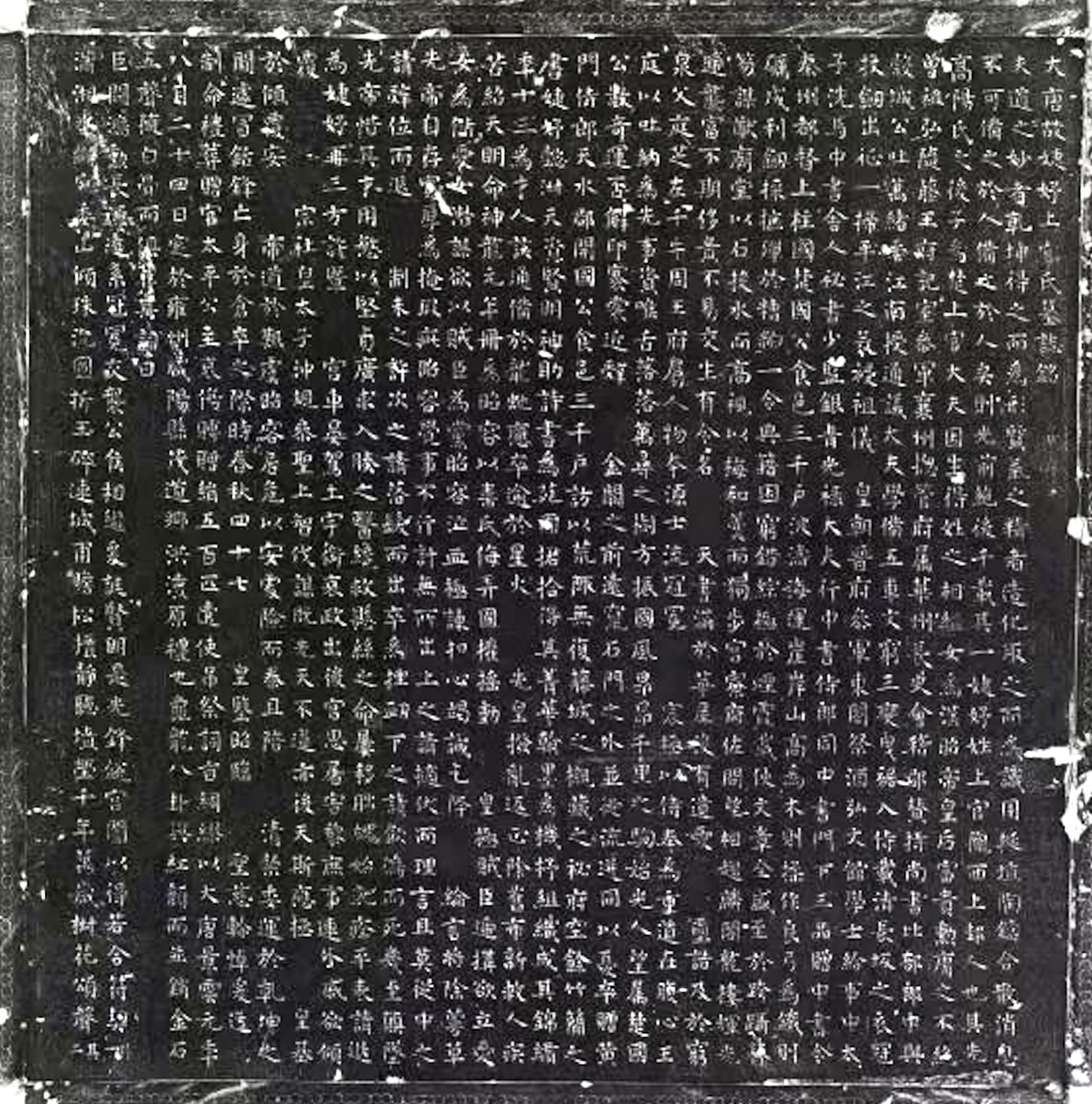
Epitaph of Shangguan Wan'er, with lid. The lid reads: 大唐故昭容上官氏銘 "Epitaph of the late imperial consort (Zhaorong) Madam Shangguan of the Great Tang dynasty".

In September 2013, it was announced that archeologists in China had discovered the tomb of Shangguan Wan'er near the airport at Xianyang, Shaanxi province. The tomb was badly damaged, perhaps deliberately according to Chinese archeologists, and only a very few burial goods were discovered inside, including some sculptures of people riding horses. The identity of the tomb's occupant was determined from an epitaph discovered in the tomb, which was inscribed "Epitaph of the late imperial consort (Zhaorong) Madam Shangguan of the Great Tang dynasty" (大唐故昭容上官氏銘) on its lid. From the epitaph it was written that Princess Taiping arranged Shangguan's burial and gave her a proper funeral. At the end of the epitaph, we can see how her death was characterized: "The waters of Xiaoxiang ceased to flow; Mount Wanwei collapsed. A round lustrous pearl sank into the depths; a priceless jade was shattered." (瀟湘水斷，宛委山傾。珠沉圓折，玉碎連城。)

== In fiction and popular culture ==
- Portrayed by Bai Hong in The Empress Wu Tse-tien (1939)
- Portrayed by Grace Ting Ning in Empress Wu Tse-Tien (1963)
- Portrayed by Qiqi Chen in Wu Zetian (1976)
- Portrayed by Lau Hung Fong in Empress Wu (1984)
- Portrayed by Pei Hsin-yu in The Empress of the Dynasty (1985) and Princess of the Dynasty (1986)
- Portrayed by Lin Zongying in Tang Ming Huang (1990)
- Portrayed by Lu Haiqin in The Legend of He Xiangu (1991)
- Portrayed by Ruping in Wu Zetian (1995)
- Portrayed by Chen Yu in Xie Yaohuan, Censor of the Great Tang (1998)
- Portrayed by Ruan Danning in Shangguan Wan'er (TV series) (1998)
- Portrayed by Bai Xue in Palace of Desire (TV series) (1999)
- Portrayed by Ursule Wong in The Love Story In The Fantasyland (1999)
- Portrayed by Zhang Danlu in Lady Wu: The First Empress (2003)
- Portrayed by Liu Yu Ting in Protector of Man for All Seasons DiRenJie (2003)
- Portrayed by Liao Xiaoqin in Wu Zi Bei Ge (2006)
- Portrayed by Leila Tong in The Greatness of a Hero (2009)
- Portrayed by Zhou Danni in Legend of The Tang Empire (2009)
- Portrayed by Li Bingbing in Detective Dee and the Mystery of the Phantom Flame (2010)
- Portrayed by Gillian Chung in Secret History of Empress Wu (2011)
- Portrayed by Li Xinyi in Tang Wenzong (2011-2012)
- Portrayed by Sun Yaoqi and Tu Liman in Secret History of Princess Taiping (2012)
- Portrayed by Florence Tan in Women of the Tang Dynasty (2013)
- Portrayed by Hou Mengyao in Shang Guan Wan Er (2013-2014)
- Portrayed as a playable Mage/Assassin hero in the Chinese mobile game 王者荣耀 (internationally known as Honor of Kings) since December 2018.

== Notes and references ==
- Old Book of Tang, vol. 51.
- New Book of Tang, vol. 76.
- Zizhi Tongjian, vols. 208, 209, 210.
