= Anti-Henan sentiment =

Prejudice towards people from Henan, China

In the 20th and 21st centuries, in mainland China, there has been discrimination against people from Henan, seen in the widespread negative stereotyping and discriminatory attitudes towards the people and province of Henan, China. This phenomenon is fueled by various social, economic, and historical factors. Misrepresentations of Henan residents have manifested in derogatory jokes, media portrayals, and public discourse, often painting the province as a hub of crime, deceit, and backwardness. Understanding the roots and impacts of this demonization sheds light on broader issues of regional prejudice and social inequality within China.

== Background ==
Location of Henan province in China

Henan is located in Zhongyuan, one of the cradles of Chinese civilization, and the reputation of its residents was historically relatively positive. During the Qing Dynasty and the Republic of China era, Henan people were viewed as 'pure and straight' and traditional, and not as deceitful.

Sometimes these ancient characterizations were extended to negative stereotypes about Henan, such as several fables about people from places in present-day Henan. The fable Catching the Rabbit from the Warring States period Han Feizi concerned a peasant refusing to change old methods, and Zheng buys shoes satirized an overly dogmatic person.

During the Ming, Qing, and the Republic of China, there was no systematic prejudice against the region; however, Wang Shixing, who held the "geographical environment determinism" in the Ming Dynasty, believed that this region was "vulgar and honest and straight in quality".

Contemporary negative stereotyping of Henan people can be traced back to the second half of the 20th century, caused by a combination of factors.

== Examples ==
Misrepresentations of Henan residents have manifested in derogatory jokes, media portrayals, and public discourse, often painting the province as a hub of crime, deceit, and backwardness.

Some factories have clearly indicated that "Henan employees will not be recruited", and a local police station in Shenzhen directly issued a warning banner on the street that "resolutely crack down on Henan extortion gangs". In the society, there is also a popular phrase, "without Henan people, there would be no anti-burglar doors," and some people's impression of Henan people is "stealing manhole covers," "selling blood," and "collecting garbage."

Male migrant workers from Henan were found to earn less than those from Anhui when working in Shanghai.

In 2023, Taiwanese singer Rainie Yang joked at a concert in Zhengzhou, Henan, that the people of Henan "have a reputation for lying", and she later apologized for the incident.

The city of Zhumadian has been singled out especially. This may have originated from the aftermath of the 1975 Banqiao Dam collapse, when locals affected by the disaster eventually became the first large batch of migrant workers to go to Guangdong. Most of these workers had little education and lived together in impoverished communities, leading to a negative perception of Zhumadian people. A popular quote going around was:

十亿人民九亿骗，河南人民是教练，总部设在驻马店
From a billion people nine hundred million are swindlers. The people of Henan are the coaches. Their headquarters are in Zhumadian

In the 2017 CMG New Year's Gala, actor Guo Donglin played in a sketch in which he prevented a relative from being scammed. The scammer's voice was noted to have a thick Henan accent, to which Guo's character said '10 out of 9 scammers are Henan people. Afterwards, the sketch's screenwriter apologized, claiming his own accent was close to the Henan accent. Guo suffered severe reputation loss and did not appear in the New Year's Gala for the first time after 23 years.

== Causes ==
From a political perspective, in mainland China, because provinces serve as geographical units of centralized central government administrative divisions, rather than independent and complete structures, entities, or organizations of education, legislation, politics, language, culture, beliefs, and other functions, powers, and spirits, the understanding of these units and scales does not have definite and objective cognitive and deductive value beyond certain natural attributes and related statistical characteristics.

=== War and famine migrants ===
In the history of thousands of years, the Central Plains has undergone dozens of dynasties, as well as foreign invasions by the Mongols, Manchus, and Japanese. Especially since modern times, these areas suffered from natural disasters and man-made disasters. Typical for example, in the 1930s and 1940s, due to the serious and sustained drought and flood disasters, but also due to the man-made 1938 Yellow River flood, resulting in large-scale displacement of refugees in the yellow plain area and the Central Plains Mandarin area, and emigrate to the northwest region or elsewhere. Similarly, in modern and contemporary history, the prejudices encountered by refugees in northern Jiangsu, southern Jiangsu, and Shanghai are based on similar reasons. It is assumed that persistent and widespread prejudice against the region began around these areas. Before the 1980s, transportation was inconvenient, and the proportion of Henan immigrants in Jiangsu and Zhejiang was very small.

=== Plasma economy and AIDS epidemic ===
Dr. Gao Yaojie was the first to reveal that farmers in some rural areas of the province were infected with AIDS by selling blood products for profit by government health departments. This has been exaggerated by some as the "Henan problem". However, Gao and others later pointed out that this problem is common in the vast majority of provinces, regions, and cities in the mainland, and Gao pointed out that the infection of AIDS caused by blood sales and blood transfusions is definitely not a case. In the mid-1990s, many Henan farmers were running to other provinces to sell blood. Newspapers exposed illegal blood collection at the North 'an Farm Hospital in Heilongjiang, where a blood seller infected 19 people. An HIV-infected person, surnamed Song, in Dehui, Jilin, sold blood to the government blood station 17 times in a year and a half, resulting in 21 people infected with AIDS.

=== Suffering from the injustice of the planning system ===
Henan province suffers from a scarcity of higher education resources, with lower college admission rates and more selective college entrance exams compared to other provinces. To obtain an acceptable quality of higher education, students have to overcome fierce competition against thousands of other people. The suspension of the expansion of the list of Project 211 has further suppressed the development of higher education in Henan. Internal migrants in China, particularly individuals hailing from Henan and the northeastern regions, often face formidable challenges in their lives.

Since the 1980s, the central state policy has been inclined to invest in the Beijing, Shanghai, Guangzhou, and Shenzhen regions, and the central and western regions have no policy support, resulting in brain drain, less foreign investment, and economic development lagging behind coastal provinces. The imbalance of economic and cultural development under the planned economy system is also related to the unequal socio-economic and political environment of the region - Henan has long been positioned by the national development strategy as "ensuring the agricultural foundation", and the degree of openness is the lowest in the six central provinces, and the data at the end of 2006 shows that the relevant openness index is only 2%, far lower than the domestic average level. Similarly, the province has the largest population base in the country, but its average GNP is low, its per capita resources are relatively small, its higher education is backward, it has a large number of migrant workers, and a relatively small proportion of the middle and cultural classes. In response, some Henan residents started producing counterfeit goods. For example, in 1993, a scandal emerged after a medicine factory in Henan was found to produce fake medicine.

As one of the few countries in the world that implements the household registration system to manage the population, China's dual division of urban and rural identity and the practice of some people or enterprises to act according to their native place result in Henan exporting a large number of migrant workers, in the situation of injustice or discrimination from time to time. In terms of social public rights and interests, taking higher education as an example, the state's division, allocation and restriction of public education resources in provinces have caused substantial damage to the rights of people in some regions, including Henan, which is a phenomenon of official discrimination that has been widely criticized in recent years. For example, Xu Youyu, a philosophy scholar at the Chinese Academy of Social Sciences, criticized that "the probability of Beijing students entering Peking University is 60 times that of Henan and 34 times that of Guizhou." The inaction of the corresponding management is seen to be largely the maintenance of the status quo by vested interests.

=== Chinese media portraying ===
Sensationalist reporting by commercial media has contributed to anti-Henan sentiment. It was found that "outside of Henan Province, the media usually emphasize the place of origin of Henan suspects by describing the fraud suspects as Henan fraudsters." In the commentary sections of news portals, users' locations by IP address are shown next to their comments, which encouraged discriminatory texts against Henan people.

=== Influenced by Chinese chauvinism and collectivism ===
Traditional Chinese society relies on the deep-rooted concept of group and tribal consciousness, which tends to recognize and label the essence of human beings by the internal blood and clan relationship and the external social and political identity, or even some accidental group attributes. In ancient times, there was the principle of "nine ethnic groups" and "punishment of the company", but the identity politics in contemporary mainland China has intensified, and after the founding of the People's Republic of China, various "identity discrimination" from the government has emerged endlessly. In addition, due to the long-term promotion of strong ideological "class struggle" thinking, "collectivist" propaganda and "patriotic" education, and the serious failure of "education" to cultivate people's cognitive ability, critical consciousness and humanistic spirit, it is easy to cause individual rights, values and dignity to be ignored or even trampled on, result in blind "self-centered" praise, beggar-thy-neighbor "chauvinism"; The collective unconscious of "non-self", "otherization" and even "demonization" strengthens and even creates the psychological basis and social environment on which regional discrimination depends.

Therefore, the people are immature and lack the consciousness of "citizen" based on the modern society, and the regional consciousness and regional discrimination are the reflection and result of the traditional "private society" and the consciousness of small farmers. Similarly, the dispute between "southerners" and "northerners" has a long history in reality. As such, prejudice is also echoed and disseminated among many people in secondary and higher education. Some analysts believe that mainland education cannot cultivate people's respect for others, responsible words and deeds, independent thinking, rational identification, and critical thinking.

Jung's theory of the collective unconscious and James Wilson's theory of the Broken Windows effect can explain this phenomenon. This phenomenon is also studied and discussed by experts and scholars who study mass communication and discrimination.

== Responses ==
Significant backslash first started appearing in the early 2000s. In 2001, the Henan provincial government released an official statement calling for a stop to the 'demonization of Henan people'.

In the first case of regional discrimination, the Internet portal NetEase designed and produced a special webpage entitled "Ren Chengyu, Li Dongzhao, Honor Defender of Henan People" in February 2006 and quoted distorted and fabricated insulting and discriminatory reports by Shanghai Evening News. After browsing, Li Dongzhao said, "NetEase is biased and uses distorted, fabricated, discriminatory and offensive old news as material, and contains a large number of insulting words on the Web page, which infringes on his own survival and health," so he filed a lawsuit against NetEase and other representative media. On June 18, 2008, the Chongwen District Court of Beijing accepted the case. But now NetEase has added "civilized society, starting from rational Posting" next to the window for posting comments.

In 2019, a Henan woman won an anti-discrimination case from a Zhejiang company that rejected her job application by including 'Henanese' as the reason for rejection. Her lawyer later said that "the case may serve as a wake-up call to employers that such practices are illegal."

In response to various non-objective and irrational words and deeds, the province's media and people from all walks of life have tried to analyze, clarify and even resort to law, such as Ma Shuo, who wrote the book "Henan people provoke", Henan lawyer Ren Chengyu, Li Dongzhao sued the Shenzhen police discriminatory slogans and was eventually dropped by mediation, Li Dongzhao sued the Internet media NetEase media discrimination and so on. In recent years, local government departments have also been working to improve the overall image of the province, and have launched some "image optimization projects", which have made some changes. Analysts generally believe that the fundamental solution to this problem lies in the awakening of people's "civic consciousness," the sound spirit of social "rule of law," and the balance and equality of the central government's political and economic development policies. For example, the "regional discrimination case" was finally withdrawn by "mediation" due to the intervention of the "superior" of the defendant's police station, which disappointed the hopes of scholars who hoped to promote the progress of the rule of law through this case.

== See also ==
- Regional discrimination in China

== Extended Reading ==
"Who Did Henan People provoke", Ma Shuo, Hainan Publishing House, 2002-03-01
