= Women of the Tang Dynasty =

- Chinese: 唐宮燕
- Hanyu Pinyin: Táng Gōng Yàn
- Genre: Costume drama
- Written by: Chan Sap-sam
- Directed by: Chang Hsiao-cheng
- Presented by: Chen Meilin
- Starring: Kara Hui; Liu Tingyu; Annie Liu; Kristy Yang; Nathan Lee; Florence Tan; He Saifei; Kou Zhenhai
- Country of origin: China
- Original language: Mandarin
- No. of episodes: 46

Production
- Executive producer: Chen Meisong
- Producers: Chen Chunxia; Chen Yiwen
- Production location: Hengdian World Studios
- Running time: 45 minutes per episode
- Production company: Lafeng Entertainment

Original release
- Network: Hunan Satellite TV
- Release: 24 August – 23 September 2013

Women of the Tang Dynasty, also known as The World of Tang Women, is a 2013 Chinese television series based on events in the Tang dynasty starting from the late reign of Wu Zetian to Emperor Xuanzong's accession to the throne. The series was produced by Lafeng Entertainment, directed by Chang Hsiao-cheng, and starred an ensemble cast from various regions. Filming for the series started in October 2011 in Hengdian World Studios. The series was first shown on Hunan Satellite TV from 24 August to 23 September 2013.

== Plot ==
This story is set during the Tang dynasty, under Wu Zetian's rule as the first female emperor of China. Eventually, Emperor Zhongzong takes the throne, but is poisoned by his wife, Empress Wei, and his daughter, Princess Anle. Empress Wei monopolizes the new emperor, and Li Longji and Princess Taiping soon rebelled.

Meng Fan and Meng Fu are two sisters who witnessed their father being executed. They enter the palace, and Meng Fan becomes the assistant of Wu Zetian, while Meng Fu is unhappy being a lowly servant. They witness the terrors and the fierce politics present in the imperial household. After Wu Zetian falls from power, Meng Fan falls in love with Li Longji, the grandson of Wu Zetian. She also tries to help Li Guo'er, Princess Anle, the only daughter of Emperor Zhongzong and Empress Wei. Li Guo'er is spoiled, since her other siblings Princess Yongtai and Li Chongrun were killed by Wu Zetian. However, Li Guo'er finds out her lover has been killed and she blames this incident on Meng Fan.

On the other hand, Meng Fu is loved by Li Chongjun, the crown prince. He vows to marry her, but she is displeased when she overhears him taking her outside of the palace. Meng Fu tells Princess Anle and Empress Wei that he's planning to rebel, and he is killed. Meng Fu also kills their child with no regret. Meng Fu becomes the assistant of Princess Anle, and her relationship with Meng Fan deteriorates. After Princess Anle and Empress Wei poison Emperor Zhongzong, they place a child puppet on the throne. Empress Dowager Wei and Princess Anle bribe Shangguan Wan'er with a lover so she can fake Emperor Zhongzong's signature. Empress Dowager Wei has intentions of being the second female emperor. The court is filled with corrupt officials.

Li Longji is extremely displeased as the nephew of Emperor Zhongzong. Wu Zetian's daughter Princess Taiping is also secretly displeased. She teams up with Li Longji to overthrow Princess Anle and Empress Dowager Wei. They rebel, and Empress Wei is shot with an arrow. Princess Anle kills Meng Fu, but Meng Fu manages to stab Princess Anle before she dies. Meng Fan is disillusioned with the troubles of the imperial palace, and leaves despite loving Li Longji. After murdering Princess Taiping, Li Longji eventually ascends as Emperor Xuanzong of Tang.

== Cast ==
=== Main ===
- Liu Tingyu as Meng Fan (based on Empress Yuanxian)
- Annie Liu as Meng Fu (based on Crown Princess Jiemin)
- Nathan Lee as Emperor Xuanzong of Tang
- He Saifei as Empress Wei
- Kara Hui as Wu Zetian
- Kristy Yang as Princess Taiping
- Chen Wei-han as Li Chongjun
- Florence Tan as Shangguan Wan'er
- Hsieh Tsu-wu as Emperor Zhongzong of Tang

=== Supporting ===
- Kou Zhenhai as Wu Sansi
- Liu Naping as Princess Anle
- Lu Yulin as Wu Chongxun
- Ken Lok as Emperor Ruizong of Tang
- Gong Yuan as Rong'er
- Deng Jie as Fangsheng
- Chen Nan as Danhua
- Zhong Jiufu as Eunuch Ma
- Yang Jianjun as Eunuch Zhou
- Dong Qi as Zhang Changzong
- Li Xiaoning as Zhang Yizhi
- Gao Hai as Zhang Lingzhen
- Wang Wenting as Xiaoyu
- Li Ruixue as Mengli
- Wang Li as Huining
- Yang Xiaodan as Yuexiu
- Cao Wei as Leichang
