= Li Duozuo =

General of Chinese Tang and Wu Zhou dynasties

Li Duozuo (Chinese: 李多祚; pinyin: Lǐ Duōzuò; died August 7, 707), noble title Prince of Liaoyang Commandery (遼陽郡王), was an ethnic Mohe general of China's Tang and Wu Zhou dynasties. He is mostly known for his participation in the successful Shenlong Coup in 705 that overthrew Wu Zetian and returned her son Emperor Zhongzong to the throne, and the failed coup of 707 in which Emperor Zhongzong's son Li Chongjun attempted to have Emperor Zhongzong's wife Empress Wei killed.

== Background ==
It is not known when Li Duozuo was born. His ancestors were said to be Mohe chieftains with the title "Yellow-headed Commandant" (黃頭都督, Huangtou Dudu). Long before Li Duozuo's time, his ancestors had submitted to Chinese rule, and the family history was not well preserved. He was said to be brave and strong, capable at archery, and for his military achievements he was made You Yingyang Da Jiangjun (右鷹揚大將軍), one of the generals commanding the imperial guards, at the recommendation of the general Pei Xingjian (裴行儉). In one of the campaigns against the Heishui Mohe, he induced the chieftains of the Heishui Mohe to feast with him and got them drunk before slaughtering them.

== During Wu Zetian's regency and reign ==
In 687, when Emperor Ruizong's mother Empress Dowager Wu (later known as Wu Zetian) served as regent, there was an invasion by the Eastern Tujue khan Ashina Gudulu and his general Ashide Yuanzhen (阿史德元珍). Empress Dowager Wu commissioned the ethnically Baekje general Heichi Changzhi, assisted by Li Duozuo, to defend against Ashina Gudulu's attack, and they were able to defeat the Eastern Tujue forces at Huanghuadui (黃花堆, in modern Shuozhou, Shanxi), causing the Eastern Tujue forces to flee.

In 694—by which time Empress Dowager Wu had seized the throne from Emperor Ruizong, establishing a new Zhou dynasty as its "emperor" and interrupting Tang—the Shiwei rose against Chinese rule, and Li Duozuo was commissioned against them. He was able to defeat the Shiwei.

In 696, the Khitan chieftains Li Jinzhong and Sun Wanrong launched a major rebellion against the Zhou rule, invading Zhou territory. Li Duozuo was one of the 28 generals sent against the Khitan, and after the Khitan rebellion ended in 697, Li Duozuo was given the slightly greater office of You Yulin Da Jiangjun (右羽林大將軍) and became the commander of the imperial guards at the north gate of the palace.

In 702, when Wu Zetian was apparently contemplating further military action in the northeast and put the chancellor Wei Yuanzhong in command, Li Duozuo made acting commandant at You Prefecture (幽州, roughly modern Beijing), assisted by the generals Xue Na and Luo Wuzheng (駱務整). However, it appeared that military action was not launched.

== Coup of 705 ==
As of spring 705, Wu Zetian was ill, and her lovers Zhang Yizhi and Zhang Changzong wielded much power, leading to speculation that they might try to displace her son Li Xian the Crown Prince, a former emperor (Emperor Ruizong's older brother). The chancellor Zhang Jianzhi, who was planning with other officials Cui Xuanwei, Huan Yanfan, Jing Hui, and Yuan Shuji, to act against Zhang Yizhi and Zhang Changzong, decided to engage Li Duozuo in the plot as well. He asked Li Duozuo, "Who gave you this glory and honor, general?" Li Duozuo wept and responded, "The Great Emperor [(i.e., Wu Zetian's husband Emperor Gaozong)]." Zhang Jianzhi then stated, "Now, the sons of the Great Emperor are being endangered by two hoodlums, and do you not want to repay the Great Emperor?" Li Duozuo responded, "As long as it is beneficial to the state, I will follow your direction, chancellor. I do not dare to consider my own safety and that of my family." He therefore agreed to join the plot.

Subsequently, with Li Xian's agreement, the coup leaders killed Zhang Yizhi and Zhang Changzong and surrounded Wu Zetian's palace, forcing her to yield the throne to Li Xian (as Emperor Zhongzong). For Li Duozuo's participation in the coup, Emperor Zhongzong created him the Prince of Liaoyang. Later that year, when Emperor Zhongzong was offering sacrifices at the imperial ancestral temple, he had Li Dan the Prince of Xiang (the former Emperor Ruizong) and Li Duozuo accompany him—a great honor—against suggestions that Li Duozuo, as a non-Han, should not be given this great of an honor equivalent to the emperor's brother.

== Coup of 707 ==
Soon, however, power slipped into the hands of Emperor Zhongzong's wife Empress Wei and her lover Wu Sansi the Prince of Dejing (Emperor Zhongzong's cousin and Wu Zetian's nephew). Zhang Jianzhi and most of the other coup leaders were falsely accused of crimes and exiled or executed. Li Duozuo, in fear, pretended to serve the interests of Empress Wei and avoided being killed himself.

Meanwhile, however, resentment against Empress Wei and Wu Sansi was brewing, centering on Emperor Zhongzong's son Li Chongjun the Crown Prince, born of a concubine. Li Chongjun was resentful toward Wu Sansi and his son Wu Chongxun (武崇訓); one reason was Wu Chongxun's encouragement of his wife Li Guo'er the Princess Anle (Empress Wei's daughter) to repeatedly ask that Emperor Zhongzong make her crown princess and displace Li Chongjun, and another was Wu Chongxun's and Li Guo'er's disrespect toward him.

In 707, Li Chongjun rose in rebellion, in conjunction with Li Duozuo, Li Qianli (李千里) the Prince of Cheng (the son of Emperor Gaozong's brother Li Ke), and Li Qianli's son Li Xi (李禧) the Prince of Tianshui. Li Duozuo's son-in-law Ye Huli (野呼利) also participated and served as the forward commander of the coup forces. The coup forces attacked Wu Sansi's mansion and killed him, Wu Chongxun, and a number of Wu Sansi's associates, and then marched on the palace, claiming to be looking to arrest Emperor Zhongzong's concubine Consort Shangguan Wan'er, who also carried on an affair with Wu Sansi. Emperor Zhongzong went up onto a palace tower to look over the events, and the coup forces stopped, as Li Chongjun hoped for a chance to talk with Emperor Zhongzong.

Meanwhile, however, Emperor Zhongzong's eunuch Yang Sixu (楊思勗) counterattacked, killing Ye and discouraging the coup forces. When Emperor Zhongzong further encouraged the soldiers to turn against the coup leaders, they did, and Li Duozuo, along with other generals participating in the coup, was killed. Eventually, Li Chongjun was killed in flight. In the aftermath, two sons of Li Duozuo were killed, and his family members were reduced to servitude.

After Emperor Zhongzong died in 710—a death that traditional historians believed to be a poisoning carried out by Empress Wei and LI Guo'er—another coup overthrew Empress Wei, and Li Dan was returned to the throne. He posthumously honored Li Chongjun and the generals participating in his coup. Li Duozuo was posthumously restored to the title of Prince of Liaoyang, and his family members were released. Emperor Ruizong was also set to bestow further honors on the coup leaders. However, the official Wei Cou (韋湊) submitted an objection, pointing out that while Empress Wei was guilty of crimes, it was still improper for Li Chongjun to start a coup. Emperor Ruizong agreed, and therefore halted further posthumous honors.

== Notes and references ==
- Old Book of Tang, vol. 109.
- New Book of Tang, vol. 110.
- Zizhi Tongjian, vols. 203, 204, 205, 207, 208.
