= Guo Donglin =

Chinese actor and xiangsheng performer (born 1966)

- 郭冬临
- Born: October 18, 1966 (age 59); Yantai, Shandong, China
- Education: Shanghai Theatre Academy
- Occupations: Actor, xiangsheng performer
- Years active: 1990-present
- Agent(s): Shanghai Media Literature and Art Group (上海音悦文化艺术有限公司)
- Parent: Guo Changyi

Chinese name
- Traditional Chinese: 郭冬臨
- Simplified Chinese: 郭冬临
Transcriptions
Standard Mandarin
- Hanyu Pinyin: Guō Dōnglín

Guo Donglin (Chinese: 郭冬临; born 18 October 1966) is a Chinese actor and xiangsheng performer.

He is notable for performing xiangsheng and sketch comedy in CCTV New Year's Gala from 1993 to 2017.

In the 2017 New Year's Gala, Guo played in a sketch in which he prevented a relative from being scammed. The scammer's voice was noted to have a thick Henan accent, to which Guo's character said '10 out of 9 scammers are Henan people', referencing anti-Henan sentiment. Guo suffered severe reputation loss from this controversy and did not appear again in the New Year's Gala for the first time after 23 years. However, news outlets noted that as an actor, Guo likely wasn't responsible for the sketch's script.

== Biography ==
Guo was born in Yantai, Shandong in October 1966, both his father Guo Changyi (郭昌仪) and mother were performing artists, he graduated from Shanghai Theatre Academy.

== Works ==
=== CCTV New Year's Gala ===
Year	Title	Chinese Title	Cast	Notes
1993		《市场速写》	Zhang Ci (张慈), Fabao (法比奥)	
1995	Something While Looking for Me	《有事您说话》	Li Wenqi (李文启), Maihongmei (买红妹)	
1996	Intersection	《路口》	Wei Ji'an (魏积安), Zhao Liang (赵亮)	
1997	Spring Festival	《过年》	Guo Da (郭达), Cai Ming (蔡明)	
1999	Ball Game Fan	《球迷》	Guo Da (郭达), Cai Ming (蔡明)	
2000		《旧曲新歌》	Feng Gong	
2001	Much Will Have More	《得寸进尺》	Feng Gong, Guo Yue (郭月)	
2002	On and Off Stage	《台上台下》	Feng Gong, Lu Ming (陆鸣)	
2003	I Swap the Roles with My Father	《我和爸爸换角色》	Jin Yuting (金玉婷), Xiaodingdang (小叮当)	
2004	A Good Man	《好人不打折》	Guo Da (郭达), Yang Lei (杨蕾)	
2005	A Man	《男子汉大丈夫》	Niu Li (牛莉)	
2006	An Honest Man	《诚实人》	Wei Ji'an (魏积安), Huang Xiaojuan (黄晓娟)	
2007	Return Home	《回家》	Shao Feng (邵峰)	
2008	News Figure	《新闻人物》	Zhou Tao (周涛)	
2010		《一句话的事儿》	Zhou Tao (周涛), Liu Jian (刘鉴)	
2012	The Supermarket Interview	《超市面试》	Wei Ji'an (魏积安), Fu Junqi (傅浚琪), He Jun (何军)	
2013				
2014				
2015				
2016				
2017	Withdrawing Money	《取钱》		

=== Television ===
Year	Title	Chinese Title	Role	Notes
1991	The Story of Editorial Staff	《编辑部的故事》	guest	
1993	I Love My Home	《我爱我家》		
1994		《东边日出西边雨》		
1996	Presidential Suite	《总统套房》		
1996	Big Magic Cube	《大魔方》		
1997	Sweet Woman	《小女人》		
1998	Palace of Desire	《大明宫词》	Emperor Zhongzong of Tang (唐中宗李显)	Golden Eagle Award for Audience's Choice for Supporting Actor
2001	Harmony Brings Wealthy	《家和万事兴》		
2001	Heroes of Sui and Tang Dynasties	《隋唐英雄传》	Cheng Yaojin (程咬金)	
2002	Dye House	《大染坊》	guest	
2002		《魂断秦淮》	Tian Hongyu (田弘遇)	
2003	Dead Men to Tell Tales	《大宋提刑官》	Li Tang (李唐)	
2003		《太太反击战》	Hua Ziqiang (华子强)	
2003		《讨个媳妇过新年》	Wan Dashan (万大山)	
2003		《女人不麻烦》	Li Shuai (李帅)	
2004	Divorced Woman	《离婚女人》	Yang Yifan (杨一凡)	
2005		《别活得太累》	Kang Delong (康德龙)	
2005	County Leader	《县令黄马褂》	Ji Xiaolan (纪晓岚)	
2005	General A Gui	《铁将军阿贵》	Tang Danian (唐大年)	
2006		《欢乐的海》	Hai Yuguang (海玉广)	
2006	The Moon	《月儿弯弯》		
2006		《上线》	Huang Shachen (黄沙尘)	
2007		《最近有点烦》	Zhou Zhai (周拽)	
2008	Su Dongpo	《苏东坡》	Monk Foyin (佛印)	
2009		《船来船往》	guest	
2009	Wanjuan Pavilion	《万卷楼》	Guo Ziyu (郭子鱼)	
2009	Highly Skilled Doctor	《神医大道公》	Erju (二举)	
2010	Twin of Brothers	《双龙传》	He Wuqiu (何无求)	
2011	Woman Soldiers	《戎装女人》		

=== Film ===
Year	Title	Chinese Title	Role	Cast	Notes
1987	The Men's World	男人的世界》	guest		
1996	Ambush	《埋伏》			
2003	Rat Love Cat	《老鼠爱上猫》	King of Xiangyang (襄阳王)		
2003	Remember	《让我们记住》			
2004	Dream Comes True	《梦想成真》			
2004	The Taxi Story	《的士情缘》			
2005	Haste Makes Waste	《心急吃不了热豆腐》	Zhang Qiang (张强)		
2012		《左眼不跳财》			

=== Drama ===
- Parisian (《巴黎人》)
- Wedding and Funeral (《红白喜事》)
- The History of Sangshuping (《桑树坪纪事》)
- Hamlet (《哈姆雷特》)
- Gala Hutong (《旮旯胡同》)
- Super Idiot (《超级笨蛋》)
- Haitang Hutong (《海棠胡同》)
