= Wu Youji =

Wu Youji (Chinese: 武攸暨) (died July 17, 712), posthumous name Prince Zhongjian of Ding (定忠簡王), was an imperial prince of the Wu Zhou dynasty and an official of the Tang dynasty. He is best known as the second husband of Wu Zetian's powerful daughter Princess Taiping.

== Background ==
It is not known when Wu Youji was born. What is known is that his grandfather Wu Shirang (武士讓) was an uncle of Emperor Gaozong's second wife Empress Wu (later known as Wu Zetian), and that he, like Wu Zetian's father Wu Shihuo (武士彠), had supported the Tang dynasty's founder Emperor Gaozu and had been, for his accomplishments, created the Duke of Xuancheng and buried with honor near Emperor Gaozu's tomb.

As of 690, Empress Wu was serving as empress dowager and regent over her son Emperor Ruizong, and Wu Youji was serving as a military officer. Empress Dowager Wu's only daughter Princess Taiping had been widowed since 688, when her husband Xue Shao (薛紹) was executed for participating in the rebellion of her cousin Li Chong, the Prince of Langye, against Empress Dowager Wu's authority. Empress Dowager Wu wanted to marry Princess Taiping to Wu Youji, who was however already married. Empress Dowager Wu therefore secretly had Wu Youji's wife assassinated, and then married Princess Taiping to him.

== During Wu Zetian's reign ==
Later in 690, Empress Dowager Wu had Emperor Ruizong yield the throne to her, establishing the Zhou dynasty as its "emperor" and interrupting the Tang dynasty. She created a number of her Wu clan relatives princes, and, after posthumously created Wu Youji's grandfather Wu Shirang the Prince of Chu, she created Wu Youji the Prince of Qiancheng. In 691, she created him the greater title of Prince of Ding. At a later point, however, his title was reduced to Prince of Anding.

Wu Youji was known for being unambitious and peaceful in his character, and, unlike Princess Taiping, who was very much involved in her mother's reign and often gave her mother advice, appeared to be largely uninvolved in Wu Zetian's governance. An exception was in 699, when Wu Zetian, in fear that after her death that her son Li Xian the Crown Prince (formerly emperor after Emperor Gaozong's death in 683 but who was quickly removed by her for disobedience in 684 in favor of Emperor Ruizong) and the Wu clan princes would not be able to coexist peacefully, had Li Xian, Li Dan (the former Emperor Ruizong), Princess Taiping, Wu Youji, and the other Wu clan princes swear an oath to each other and read the oaths to the gods. The oaths were then carved on iron and kept in the imperial archives.

== During Emperor Zhongzong's and Emperor Ruizong's second reigns ==
In 705, a coup led by the officials Zhang Jianzhi, Cui Xuanwei, Jing Hui, Huan Yanfan, and Yuan Shuji killed Wu Zetian's lovers Zhang Yizhi and Zhang Changzong, overthrew Wu Zetian, and restored Li Xian to the throne (as Emperor Zhongzong). Princess Taiping participated in the coup as well, and after Emperor Zhongzong assumed the throne, he credited both Wu Youji and his cousin Wu Sansi with participating in the coup as well, and he restored Wu Youji to the greater title of Prince of Ding and gave him the honorific title of Situ (one of the Three Excellencies). Wu Youji declined both, and subsequently, when Emperor Zhongzong reduced the Wu clan princes' titles in accordance with public sentiment, Wu Youji's title was reduced to Prince of Leshou. Emperor Zhongzong, believing that 16 officials, including Wu Youji, Wu Sansi, and the officials who actually carried out the coup, were contributors to his reign, granted them iron certificates that were supposed to guarantee that, except for treason, they would be pardoned from death 10 times. (However, Emperor Zhongzong subsequently turned away from these promises as to Zhang, Cui, Jing, Huan, and Yuan, as the five were falsely accused of crimes by Wu Sansi and exiled, and then died or were executed in exile.)

In 707, during a drought, Emperor Zhongzong sent Wu Sansi and Wu Youji to the tomb of Emperor Gaozong and Wu Zetian (who had died later than Gaozong, in 705) to pray for rain. When rain came, Emperor Zhongzong used this as the reason to restore the ancestral temple of the Wu ancestors and restore the tombs of Wu Shihuo and Wu Zetian's mother Lady Yang to imperial tomb status.

In 710, Emperor Zhongzong suddenly died — a death that traditional historians believed to be a poisoning carried out by his wife Empress Wei and daughter Li Guo'er the Princess Anle, as Empress Wei wanted to be emperor and Li Guo'er wanted to be crown princess. Emperor Zhongzong's son by a concubine, Li Chongmao the Prince of Wen was installed as emperor, but Empress Wei retained power as empress dowager. Less than a month later, a coup led by Princess Taiping and Li Dan's son Li Longji the Prince of Linzi killed Empress Wei and Li Guo'er. At the urging of Princess Taiping, Li Longji, and Li Longji's brother Li Chengqi the Prince of Song, Li Dan retook the throne. After the coup, many Wu clan members who had supported Empress Wei were killed, and the survivors had their ranks reduced. Wu Youji's title was reduced to Duke of Chu.

Emperor Ruizong would often discuss with Princess Taiping many policies and guidelines for governing the government, and the two would discuss together for a long time, and whenever the prime ministers are reporting and proposaling, Emperor Ruizong ask if he has discussed with Princess Taiping and Li Longji, and he ruled by balancing the opinions of both. At that time, Emperor Ruizong would firmly support it. The promotion and descending of the military and civil officials are all under the control of Princess Taiping, and whenever Emperor Ruizong convened the court, Princess Taiping listened behind a beaded curtain to the courtiers' conversations with the emperor about administration and was allowed to interfere in the all conversation, therefore, she could have a more direct presence with more legitimacy in the exercise of power. Her three sons were created princes, and her mansion was the size of a palace and even more magnificent. By 711, a power struggle between Princess Taiping and Li Longji (who was created crown prince) had become intense, and at the suggestion of the chancellors Song Jing and Yao Yuanzhi, Emperor Ruizong briefly sent Princess Taiping and Wu Youji out of the capital Chang'an, to live in Pu Prefecture (蒲州, roughly modern Yuncheng, Shanxi) to try to defuse the situation. Subsequently, when Princess Taiping complained, Song and Yao were demoted, and Princess Taiping and Wu Youji were recalled to Chang'an. Later that year, in order to please Wu Youji, Princess Taiping requested that Wu Shihuo's and Lady Yang's tombs be again returned to imperial tomb status. (They had been again stripped of their imperial tomb status after the coup against Empress Wei.)

In 712, Wu Youji died. Emperor Ruizong posthumously honored him and created him the Prince of Ding, with the posthumous name Zhongjian (literally meaning "faithful and approachable"). In 713, after Emperor Ruizong had passed the throne to Li Longji, who took the throne as Emperor Xuanzong, Emperor Xuanzong and Princess Taiping's conflict came to a head. Emperor Xuanzong, suspecting Princess Taiping to be plotting to overthrow him, acted against her first, and, after he killed a number of her associates, he forced her to commit suicide. After her death, Wu Youji's grand tomb was destroyed.

== Notes and references ==
- Old Book of Tang, vol. 183.
- New Book of Tang, vol. 206.
- Zizhi Tongjian, vols. 204, 206, 208, 209, 210.
