= Princess Changning =

Princess Changning 长宁公主
- Tang Princess
- Born: 680s
- Father: Emperor Zhongzong
- Mother: Empress Wei

Princess Changning (Chinese: 長寧公主; pinyin: Chángníng gōngzhǔ; 680 – after 728) was a Chinese princess, the daughter of Emperor Zhongzong of Tang and Empress Wei. She was known as her father's favourite daughter. She held significant influence within the court.

She married Yang Shenjiao of Hongnong, Duke Guan (弘農 楊慎交; 675–724), and had issue (two sons and one daughter); she then married Su Yanbo (蘇彥伯; 687–745) in 728.
