= Palace of Desire (TV series) =

- DVD cover art
- Also known as: Da Ming Gong Ci
- Traditional Chinese: 大明宮詞
- Simplified Chinese: 大明宫词
- Literal meaning: Ci of the Daming Palace
- Hanyu Pinyin: Dà Míng Gōng Cí
- Genre: Historical drama
- Screenplay by: Zheng Zhong; Wang Yao
- Directed by: Li Shaohong; Zeng Nianping
- Starring: Chen Hong; Zhou Xun; Gua Ah-leh; Winston Chao
- Composer: Lin Hai
- Country of origin: China
- Original language: Mandarin
- No. of episodes: 37

Production
- Producer: Li Xiaowan
- Production location: China
- Cinematography: Zeng Nianping
- Running time: 45 minutes per episode
- Production company: CCTV

Original release
- Network: CCTV-8

Palace of Desire, also known as Daming Gong Ci (literally "Ci of the Daming Palace"), is a Chinese television series based on the life of Princess Taiping, a daughter of China's only female emperor, Wu Zetian. Directed by Li Shaohong and Zeng Nianping, the series starred Chen Hong, Zhou Xun, Gua Ah-leh and Winston Chao in the leading roles. It was first broadcast on CCTV-8 in mainland China on 30 March 2000. The show is noted for its highly poetic dialogue, written in Western-inflected Chinese and a Shakespearean theatrical style.

== Plot ==
This story is set during the Tang dynasty, spanning the reign of Emperor Gaozong, Wu Zetian, Emperor Zhongzong, and Emperor Ruizong.

Princess Taiping was born to Empress Wu and Emperor Gaozong of Tang. She was pampered and doted on by her mother, and free from the struggles that her brothers face. The innocent princess fell in love with Xue Shao, a commoner she met outside of the palace. She was determined to marry him, and Empress Wu allowed for their marriage. Xue Shao already had a wife and refused to marry Princess Taiping. Empress Wu then murdered Xue Shao's wife so the daughter she dearly loved would find happiness. Xue Shao was saddened and committed suicide in front of Princess Taiping. That was the moment when Princess Taiping realized the horror of her mother's power.

After her mother became the Emperor, Princess Taiping withheld great power regarding politics. The princess decided to be rebellious and remarried to Wu Sansi's cousin, Wu Youji. Wu Youji was kind and harmless, but the princess wasn't content with her life. Wu Youji was known for conducting a special kind of medicine and gained the favor of Wu Zetian. This medicine also led him to have an affair by mistake. He committed suicide out of guilt towards Princess Taiping. After two failed marriages, the widowed princess was disillusioned with her identity.

One day, she met a man who looked exactly like Xue Shao. His name was Zhang Yizhi, and he would change her life. She fell in love with him, but Wu Zetian saw through Zhang Yizhi's motives. He was a womanizer that took advantage of others to benefit himself and Wu Zetian forced him to leave Princess Taiping. Zhang Yizhi became Wu Zetian's lover, to the horror of the princess. Once again, she felt lonely and depressed longing for love.

Eventually, Wu Zetian loses her power after a decade of politics struggles. Before she dies, she resolves her misunderstandings with her daughter, and the two embrace each other one last time. After her mother's death, Princess Taiping becomes ambitious about politics. This leads to conflicts with her sister-in-law, Lady Wei. Lady Wei wanted to be the next Wu Zetian and she was trusted and loved by her husband, Emperor Zhongzong. This trust led to his demise, as he was poisoned by his daughter, Princess Anle. Princess Anle and her mother Lady Wei were corrupt and Princess Taiping couldn't bear witnessing the destruction of her family.

Princess Taiping overthrows Lady Wei and Princess Anle, and returns power to her brother. Her life is peaceful, until Xue Shao's son Xue Chongjian suggests her to take the throne. Xue Chongjian secretly poisons a prince named Li Chongmao and Li Dan, Princess Taiping's brother and the current Emperor. However, the plan is revealed to Li Longji, Li Dan's son and the nephew of Princess Taiping. She tries to assassinate him, but he survives. Li Longji reveals that his feelings for her are greater than an aunt-nephew relationship. He loved her for twenty years, but Princess Taiping only loved him as a nephew. She was already disillusioned with palace life and politics. After she reminisced her bitter life as a princess, Princess Taiping committed suicide in the Daming Palace.

== Cast ==
- Chen Hong as Princess Taiping
  - Zhou Xun as young Princess Taiping
- Gua Ah-leh as Wu Zetian
- Winston Chao as Xue Shao / Zhang Yizhi
- Li Zhixing as Emperor Gaozong of Tang
- Shen Junyi as Wu Sansi
- Fu Biao as Wu Youji
- Guo Donglin as Li Xian (Emperor Zhongzong of Tang)
- Jia Ni as Lady Wei
  - Hu Jing as Wei Xiang'er (young Lady Wei)
- Li Bingbing as Princess Anle
- He Lin as Lady of Wei
- Liu Dong as Li Hong
- Sun Bin as Li Xian
- Wang Tao as Li Dan (Emperor Ruizong of Tang)
  - Yuan Shilong as young Li Dan
- Gao Dongping as Zhang Changzong
- Wu Jun as Li Longji (Emperor Xuanzong of Tang)
- Zhao Yi as Xue Huaiyi
- Fu Heng as Wu Chengsi
- Zhang Ping as Ming Qingyuan
- Li Aijun as Cui Ti
- Lei Ming as Xue Shao's father
- Gao Fang as Xue Shao's mother
- Lin Xin as Wet Nurse Chun
- Yang Yuting as Jinniang
- Tan Xiaoyan as Lady Ru
- Gong Lijun as Lady of Han
- Cong Peixin as Li Yifu
- Zheng Zhong as Qapaghan Qaghan
- Zhang Zhenyuan as Zhou Xing
- Yan Huaili as Pei Yan
- Zhang Chunian as Deshun
- Guan Zongxiang as Lu Haoweng

== Soundtrack ==
Palace of Desire Original Soundtrack (大明宫词电视原声专辑)

Soundtrack album by Lin Hai
- Released: 1. 2003; 2. 18 April 2011
- Label: China Scientific And Cultural Audio-Video Publishing House

The music for the series was composed by Lin Hai (林海). In 2011 China Scientific And Cultural Audio-Video Publishing House (中国科学文化音像出版社) released an extended version of the original soundtrack.

=== Track list (2003 version) ===
#	Track title	Credits
1	序曲 (pinyin: Xù Qǔ) (translation: Overture)	
2	太平 (pinyin: Tài Píng) (translation: Peace)	Performed by Li Yan (李研)
3	死亡 (pinyin: Sǐ Wáng) (translation: Death)	
4	背叛 (pinyin: Bèi Pàn) (translation: Betrayal)	
5	长相守 (pinyin: Cháng Xiāng Shǒu) (translation: Live Together Forever)	Performed by Ai Huina (爱慧娜)
6	温泉水 (pinyin: Wēn Quán Shuǐ) (translation: Hot Spring Water)	
7	母亲 (pinyin: Mǔ Qīn) (translation: Mother)	
8	长相守 (pinyin: Cháng Xiāng Shǒu) (translation: Live Together Forever)	Performed by Wang Lan (王兰)

=== Track list (2011 version) ===
#	Track title
1	盛世·大明宫 (pinyin: Shèng Shì Dà Míng Gōng) (translation: Golden Age, Daming Palace)
2	印迹 (pinyin: Yìn Jì) (translation: Imprint)
3	一个人的红尘 (pinyin: Yī Gè Rén Dè Hóng Chén) (translation: One Person's Red Dust)
4	漩涡 (pinyin: Xuán Wō) (translation: Whirlpool)
5	孤寂 (pinyin: Gū Jì) (translation: Loneliness)
6	梦魇 (pinyin: Mèng Mó) (translation: Devil in Dream)
7	升平 (pinyin: Shēng Píng) (translation: Peace and Prosperity)
8	将倾 (pinyin: Jiàng Qīng) (translation: Incline)
9	甜蜜 (pinyin: Tián Mì) (translation: Sweet)

#	Track title
10	母亲 (pinyin: Mǔ Qīn) (translation: Mother)
11	背叛 (pinyin: Bèi Pàn) (translation: Betrayal)
12	囚 (pinyin: Qíu) (translation: Incarceration)
13	无邪 (pinyin: Wú Xié) (translation: Innocent)
14	幻境 (pinyin: Huàn Jìng) (translation: Imaginary World)
15	成真 (pinyin: Chéng Zhēn) (translation: Becomes Reality)
16	繁华背后 (pinyin: Fán Huá Bèi Hòu) (translation: Behind the Prosperity)
17	旋 (pinyin: Xuán) (translation: Revolve)
18	夜宴 (pinyin: Yè Yàn) (translation: Evening Banquet)

#	Track title
19	盼 (pinyin: Pàn) (translation: Yearn)
20	博 (pinyin: Bó) (translation: Obtain)
21	千钧一发 (pinyin: Qiān Jūn Yī Fā) (translation: Crucial Moment)
22	寂寞红 (pinyin: Jì Mò Hóng) (translation: Lonely Red)
23	一曲茶炉暖色 (pinyin: Yī Qǔ Chá Lú Nuǎn Sè) (translation: Warm Colours of a Stove)
24	长安夜市 (pinyin: Cháng Ān Yè Shì) (translation: Chang'an Night Market)
25	叹 (pinyin: Tàn) (translation: Sigh)
26	夜·舞媚 (pinyin: Yè Wǔ Mèi) (translation: Evening, Dance)
27	长相守 (pinyin: Cháng Xiāng Shǒu) (translation: Live Together Forever)

== Awards ==
Year	Award	Category
2000	18th China TV Golden Eagle Awards	
2000	18th China TV Golden Eagle Awards	Best Television Series
2000	18th China TV Golden Eagle Awards	Best Cinematography
2000	18th China TV Golden Eagle Awards	Best Lighting
2000	18th China TV Golden Eagle Awards	Audience's Choice for Most Popular Actress (Zhou Xun)
2000	18th China TV Golden Eagle Awards	Audience's Choice for Supporting Actor (Guo Donglin)
2000	18th China TV Golden Eagle Awards	Audience's Choice for Supporting Actress (Zhou Xun)
2001	21st Flying Apsaras Awards	Best Art Direction
2001	21st Flying Apsaras Awards	Best Television Series
