= Princess Taiping =

Tang dynasty princess (d. 713)

- Born: After 662 (Note: Historical sources did not record the year of Princess Taiping's birth. However, Emperor Ruizong was recorded to have addressed her as a younger sister. Thus, she must be born after 662, since Ruizong was born in June 662.)
- Died: 2 August 713
- Spouse: Xue Shao; Wu Youji, Prince Zhongjian of Ding
- Issue: Xue Chongxun; Xue Chongjian; Lady Wanquan; Wu Chongmin; Wu Chongxing; Lady Wu; Lady Yonghe (possibly)
- House: Li
- Father: Emperor Gaozong of Tang
- Mother: Empress Zetian

Princess Taiping
- Chinese: 太平公主
Transcriptions
Standard Mandarin
- Hanyu Pinyin: Tàipíng Gōngzhǔ
- IPA: IPAc-cmntai4pʰiŋ2 kʊŋ1ʈ͡ʂu3
Yue: Cantonese
- Jyutping: taai3 ping4 gung1 zyu2
- IPA: IPAc-yuetaai3 ping4 gung1 zyu2

Princess Taiping (Chinese: 太平公主; pinyin: Tàipíng Gōngzhǔ; literally "Princess of Great Peace"; born after 662 – died 2 August 713 (Note: The Zizhi Tongjian recorded that three days before Princess Taiping was ordered to commit suicide, Tang Ruizong (by then the Taishang Huang) released an edict, declaring that Emperor Xuanzong was to be solely in charge of the empire's affairs. This edict was released on the yichou day of the 7th month of the 1st year of the Kaiyuan era of Tang Xuanzong's reign. This date corresponds to 30 July 713 in the Gregorian calendar. By calculation, Princess Taiping died on the wuchen day of the same month, which corresponds to 2 August 713 on the Gregorian calendar.)), personal name unknown, was a member of the imperial family of the Tang dynasty and a political figure active during the reigns of her mother Wu Zetian, and her brothers Emperor Zhongzong and Emperor Ruizong (both of whom reigned twice), particularly during Emperor Ruizong's second reign, when for three years until her death, she was the real power behind the throne. Her personal name is not recorded in official histories, though some later sources suggest it may have been Li Lingyue (李令月). (Note: Some scholars, interpreting a submission that her brother Li Zhe made while making a food offering to Emperor Gaozong and Empress Wu, written on his behalf by the official Cui Rong (崔融) and subsequently collected in the collection Full Tang Texts (全唐文), believed her name to be Li Lingyue (李令月), but the text cannot be conclusively interpreted in that manner. See [-http://www.dushu.com/showbook/100829/1025091.html Full Tang Texts], vol. 217.)

She played a significant role in court politics during a period of dynastic transition, including the restoration of the Tang dynasty following Wu Zetian’s abdication. Princess Taiping was involved in the 705 coup that reinstated Emperor Zhongzong and later supported the 710 purge of Empress Wei’s faction. During Emperor Ruizong’s second reign (710–712), she held considerable influence over state affairs and was regarded as a key figure in the administration.

Following Emperor Ruizong’s abdication in favor of his son Li Longji (later Emperor Xuanzong) in 712, tensions between Princess Taiping and the new emperor escalated. In 713, according to historical records, believing that she was planning to overthrow him, acted first, executing a large number of her powerful allies and forcing her to commit suicide.

== Early life ==
The exact birth date of Princess Taiping remains unknown, but she was the youngest of six known children born to Emperor Gaozong and his second wife, Empress Wu .This places her birth either around the same time as her brother Li Dan (the future Emperor Ruizong) or sometime after; some scholars say she was born around 665 AD.

In her early years, Princess Taiping lived in the Ziwei Palace in the western section of the imperial city in Luoyang, near the Jiuzhou Pond area. When she was about five or six years old, she frequently visited the home of her maternal grandmother, Lady of Rongguo, located in the Jiaoyi Ward of Luoyang, during one of these visits, a palace maid accompanying her was sexually assaulted by her cousin, Helan Minzhi. This incident enraged Wu Zetian, especially since Helan Minzhi had previously raped the woman who was to become the crown princess. As a result, Wu Zetian stripped Helan Minzhi of his status as heir to the Wu family, exiled him, and ultimately had him executed on route.

In 670, when Empress Wu's mother Lady Yang died, Empress Wu had Princess Taiping become a Taoist nun to gain divine favor on behalf of Lady Yang.

=== Failed marriage ===
Later, during the Yifeng era (676–679), while Emperor Gaozong was engaged in peace negotiations with the Tibetan kingdom of Tufan, the Tufan king proposed marriage to Princess Taiping. Gaozong declined the offer. To diplomatically sidestep the proposal, he commissioned the construction of a Taoist temple named Taiping Temple (太平觀) and appointed Princess Taiping as its abbess. (Note: The Zizhi Tongjian listed the above two events under the entry for the 1st year of Emperor Gaozong's Kaiyao era, which corresponds to 681 in the Gregorian calendar. However, the word "chu" (初) at the start of the record indicated that the two events took place earlier.)

== First Marriage ==
In 681, Emperor Gaozong and Empress Wu arranged a marriage between Princess Taiping and her cousin Xue Shao (薛紹), the son of Princess Chengyang (Gaozong’s sister) and her second husband, Xue Yao (薛曜). The wedding was a grand affair held in the autumn of that year. According to historical accounts, the procession from the palace to the Xuanyang District (宣陽坊)—where the Xue family resided—was so lavishly lit with torches that the heat and smoke reportedly scorched trees lining the streets.

Empress Wu, however, expressed disdain for the wives of Xue Shao’s brothers Lady Xiao (wife of Xue Yi) and Lady Cheng (wife of Xue Xu) believing their backgrounds were too humble for her daughter’s in-laws. She reportedly remarked, “How can my daughter be a sister-in-law to the daughters of farmers?” Although she considered forcing the brothers to divorce, she relented when informed that Lady Xiao was a grandniece of the deceased chancellor Xiao Yu.

Princess Taiping and Xue Shao had two sons, Xue Chongxun (薛崇訓) and Xue Chongjian (薛崇簡), as well as a daughter, born in 686, who was later granted the title Lady Wanquan (萬泉縣主).

== Early Political Influence and Second Marriage ==
Emperor Gaozong died in 683 and was succeeded by Princess Taiping's older brother Crown Prince Li Zhe (as Emperor Zhongzong), but actual power was in the hands of Empress Wu, as empress dowager and regent. In 684, when Emperor Zhongzong showed signs of independence, she deposed him and replaced him with another brother of Princess Taiping's, Li Dan, Prince of Yu (as Emperor Ruizong), but thereafter wielded power even more firmly. As she viewed Princess Taiping as similar to her in appearance and attitude, she favored Princess Taiping greatly and often discussed the affairs of the state with her.

In 688, after a failed rebellion against Empress Dowager Wu led by Emperor Gaozong's brother Li Zhen, Prince of Yue and Li Zhen's son Li Chong, Prince of Langye, Xue Yi, Xue Xu, and Xue Shao were discovered as having conspired with Li Chong. Xue Yi and Xue Xu were beheaded, while Xue Shao was caned 100 times and starved to death — which led to more suffering, but which allowed his body to remain whole and thus was considered a more honorable death.

In 690, Empress Dowager Wu wanted to remarry Princess Taiping to Wu Youji, a grandson of Empress Dowager Wu's uncle Wu Shileng (武士稜). Wu Youji, however, was already married, and Empress Dowager Wu secretly had Wu Youji's wife assassinated so that Princess Taiping could marry him. With Wu Youji, Princess Taiping would have an additional two sons — Wu Chongmin (武崇敏) and Wu Chongxing (武崇行) — and one daughter. A possible second daughter, titled Lady Yonghe (永和县主), was also born to them.

== Emperor Wu Zetian's reign ==
Later in 690, Empress Dowager Wu had Emperor Ruizong yield the throne to her, establishing the Zhou dynasty with herself as its "emperor" (therefore interrupting the Tang dynasty).

In or before 697, Princess Taiping recommended Zhang Changzong to serve as Wu Zetian's lover. Zhang Changzong further recommended his brother Zhang Yizhi as well.

Also in 697, Wei Suizhong (衛遂忠), a friend of the secret police official Lai Junchen, revealed that Lai had intended to accuse Princess Taiping, the Wu clan princes, Li Dan, and Li Zhe of treason. Princess Taiping and the Wu clan princes, in response, accused Lai of crimes, and Wu Zetian put Lai to death.

In 699, when the chancellor Zong Chuke (a son of Wu Zetian's cousin) and Zong Chuke's brother Zong Jinqing (宗晉卿) were accused of corruption and exiled, Princess Taiping visited the Zongs' mansions and commented, "Once we look at their mansions, it is like we have not lived."

Also in 699, Wu Zetian, in fear that after her death that Li Zhe (who by now had changed his name to Li Xian and then further to Wu Xian and had been recalled to be crown prince again) and the Wu clan princes would not be able to coexist peacefully, had him, Li Dan, Princess Taiping, Wu Youji, and the other Wu clan princes swear an oath to each other and read the oaths to the gods. The oaths were then carved on iron and kept in the imperial archives.

In 702, Wu Zetian had Li Xian, Li Dan, and Princess Taiping submit formal petitions to have Zhang Changzong created a prince. She then formally rejected the petitions but created Zhang Changzong and Zhang Yizhi dukes.

In 703, a favorite official of Princess Taiping's, who might have been her lover, Gao Jian (高戩), was accused by the Zhangs of agreeing with the chancellor Wei Yuanzhong, whom the Zhangs had resented, that Wu Zetian was old and that it would be more secure to support the crown prince. Wu Zetian, in anger, had Wei and Gao arrested and subsequently exiled.

== Emperor Zhongzong's second reign ==
In 705, a coup led by the officials Zhang Jianzhi, Cui Xuanwei, Jing Hui, Huan Yanfan, and Yuan Shuji killed Zhang Yizhi and Zhang Changzong and overthrew Wu Zetian, restoring Li Xian to the throne. Princess Taiping was said to be involved in the coup, and after Emperor Zhongzong's restoration, he gave her the special title of Zhenguo Taiping Gongzhu (鎮國太平公主) — literally "the Princess Taiping who secured the state." He also established her own luxurious palace, and she enjoyed five thousand households, so she became very much rich, therefore, her power skyrocketed and she found a say in court politics. Later, Emperor Zhongzong specially sent a number of Imperial Army guards to be stationed at Princess Taiping's mansion. An imperial guard was set up around her mansion and there were also many fully armed guards patrolling day and night to protect her and protecting her was a lot like protecting the emperor. This alone is enough to see Princess Taiping's exalted position in Emperor Zhongzong's reign. In 706, she, along with Emperor Zhongzong's daughters Princesses Changning, Anle (Li Guo'er), Yicheng, Xindu, and Ding'an, and Princess Jincheng (the daughter of Princess Taiping's nephew Li Shouli the Prince of Yong), were allowed to retain staffs, similar to imperial princes. As a result, they led a governmental structure, and the staffs and offices they held were part of a governmental mechanism and it was like setting up a government. She became one of the powerful women at court, although her power was rivaled by Emperor Zhongzong's wife Empress Wei and Li Guo'er. As a result, Princess Taiping with Empress Wei and Li Guo'er were engaged in party battles to seize power and eliminate each other.

After Emperor Zhongzong ascended the throne, Empress Wei and Li Guo'er dominated his reign and their lifestyle was completely promiscuous and extravagant, both tried to imitate Wu Zetian: Empress Wei successfully imitated Empress Wu's position during the reign of Emperor Gaozong, who listened to politics with a curtain at court next to the emperor, and effectively participating in both military and civil decisions, and Li Guo'er brought chaos to his father's administration with rampant lawlessness and corruption, and in an unsuccessful attempt she tried to convince Emperor Zhongzong to make her crown princess.

In 707, after Emperor Zhongzong's son Li Chongjun the Crown Prince, angry over Li Guo'er's repeated attempts to displace him to become crown princess, failed in a rebellion to arrest Empress Wei and Li Guo'er, Li Guo'er and Zong Chuke (now chancellor again) tried to implicate Princess Taiping and Li Dan in Li Chongjun's plot, Emperor Zhongzong requested Xiao to investigate, but after Xiao Zhizhong spoke on their behalf, weeping, responded:

Your Imperial Majesty owns the world and is honored as the Son of Heaven, but how can you not protect even one brother and one sister from false accusations? This is a matter that goes to the survival of the dynasty. Even though I, your subject, am foolish, I still believe that this is not to be considered. The Book of Han stated, "One chi of cloth can be sewn. One dou of grain can be ground. But two brothers cannot tolerate each other." I wish that Your Imperial Majesty would carefully think about that passage. Further, in the past, everyone knew that Empress Zetian wanted to let the Prince of Xiang be crown prince, but the Prince went on a fast to beg for Your Imperial Majesty's return. His great faithfulness in yielding the position is known throughout the realm, and this shows that Ran's accusations are false.

Emperor Zhongzong stopped investigations against Princess Taiping and Li Dan. From this time on, Princess Taiping with Li Longji spent time to cultivate relationships with some imperial guard commanders, and she began to attract some middle-ranking officials around her. As a result, she expand her power to compete with Empress Wei and Princess Anle and their faction, and sought to protect herself and her brother Li Dan.

== Empress dowager Wei's regency ==
Emperor Zhongzong died suddenly in 710 — a death that traditional historians believed to be a murder carried out by Empress Wei and Li Guo'er so that Empress Wei could become emperor and Li Guo'er could become crown princess. In the aftermath of Emperor Zhongzong's death, Empress Wei, who initially kept the death secret, tried to consolidate power; she immediately ordered that the palace and the capital be sealed. All the gates were blockaded and exit of the capital forbidden, and summoned her allied officials into the palace, and mobilized a total of 50,000 soldiers from various prefectures to be stationed in Chang'an City, and immediately put Wei Wen in overall command of the imperial guards, with his cousin Wei Xuan (韋璿) and nephews Wei Bo (韋播) and Gao Song (高嵩) in command as well. But Emperor Zhongzong's death was discovered by Princess Taiping faster than Empress Wei wanted to secure her power, and Princess Taiping and another powerful woman, Emperor Zhongzong's concubine Consort Shangguan Wan'er, drafted a will on Emperor Zhongzong's behalf that attempted to balance the various factions — having Emperor Zhongzong's son by another concubine, Li Chongmao the Prince of Wen, take the throne, and having Empress Wei as empress dowager and regent, assisted by Li Dan. This performance of Princess Taiping angered Empress Wei and her clan and faction. Immediately, Empress Wei's cousin Wei Wen, wanting to have Empress Wei take sole power, however, modified the will to remove Li Dan as coregent. Accordingly, Li Chongmao took the throne (as Emperor Shang), while Empress Wei became empress dowager and regent. The foiling of Princess Taiping's plan terrified her and her followers, prompting them to wage a carefully planned war against Empress Dowager Wei and her powerful clan and faction.

Meanwhile, Empress Dowager Wei's clan members, along with Zong Chuke, Li Guo'er's husband Wu Yanxiu (武延秀), and other officials Zhao Lüwen (趙履溫) and Ye Jingneng (葉靜能) were advising her to take the throne, like Wu Zetian did, and they also advised her to eliminate Li Dan and Princess Taiping. The official Cui Riyong leaked their plan to Li Dan's son Li Longji the Prince of Linzi. Li Longji responded by conspiring with Princess Taiping, Princess Taiping's son Xue Chongjian, as well as several low level officials close to him — Zhong Shaojing, Wang Chongye (王崇曄), Liu Youqiu, and Ma Sizong (麻嗣宗) — to act first. Meanwhile, Empress Wei's nephews Wei Bo (韋播) and Gao Song (高嵩), who had recently been put in command of imperial guards and who had tried to establish their authority by dealing with the guards harshly, had alienated the guards, and the guard officers Ge Fushun (葛福順), Chen Xuanli (陳玄禮), and Li Xianfu (李仙鳧) thereafter also joined the plot.

Under the full planning and some command actions of Princess Taiping (such as financing, gathering opposition political and military forces against Empress Dowager Wei, joining the army to attack the palace, and carefully preparing how to attack), without first informing Li Dan, the conspirators (under the joint leadership of Princess Taiping and Li Longji) rose on 21 July, first killing Wei Bo, Gao, and Empress Wei's cousin Wei Gui (韋璿). They then attacked the palace. Li Longji rushed directly into the heart of the enemy with 10,000 armed soldiers, and looked for Empress Dowager Wei and Li Guo'er. When Empress Dowager Wei panicked and fled to an imperial guard camp, a guard beheaded her. Li Guo'er, Wu Yanxiu, and Lady Helou were killed as well. Li Longji soon slaughtered a number of officials in Empress Dowager's faction as well as her clan, while displaying Empress Dowager Wei's body on the street. Thereafter, at the urging of Princess Taiping, Li Longji, and Li Longji's brother Li Chengqi the Prince of Song, Li Dan retook the throne. In fact, no one dared to praise or propose Li Dan as emperor, Princess Taiping did it first, and Princess Taiping summoned the courtiers and decided to transfer power from Emperor Shang to Li Dan and she was bold enough to told all the officials:

"The empire used to belong to the prime minister (Li Dan), let him become emperor again."

She also told the little emperor:

"Emperor, can you give the throne to your uncle? Everybody turns to the prime minister (Li Dan), this is not your throne."

Princess Taiping grabbed Emperor Shang's collar at the replacement ceremony and lowered him while he was still sitting on the throne, reducing Li Chongmao back to the title of Prince of Wen, and she ordered his arrest. She took Li Dan's hand and placed him on the throne, and following her actions, Li Longji also expressed his support and guaranteed his father reign.

== Emperor Ruizong's second reign ==
After Emperor Ruizong returned to the throne, she was awarded the unprecedented title of Zhenguo Taiping Gongzhu Wanhou (鎮國太平公主万侯) — literally "the Princess Taiping who secured the state and has the obedience of all." Against this backdrop, the following edict was issued in the name of Ruizong to reward Princess Taiping with additional households of income:

The persons who succeed in settling the Temple and the Altar greatly transcend their peers. The deeds that exceed the scope of silk-and-bamboo [that is, historical] records forever shine upon their greatness.

Princess Guardian of the Realm and of the Great Peace: [in her,] the illustrious blossom shares its luster; the luxuriant plum exudes its fragrance. As offspring of the same blood, she enjoyed the love of the previous sovereigns." [She is] loyal and filial in how she conducts herself, and her benevolence and discernment surpass all others. There is nowhere to which her talents do not extend, and nothing that her mind does not grasp. Previously, she resolved the catastrophe afflicting the Realm; then, she supported Us as the emperor. Her supreme righteousness moves Heaven; her earnest sincerity binds her to the sun.

The turmoil has been settled; we hear only humble words [from her]. The land of her estates has not been augmented; We then receive her pleas, declining noble [rewards]. We, the emperor, envelop everything with extreme impartiality. How can We follow others in being constrained by the trivial norms? It is appropriate that We endow additional territory [to her]; let the land be hers until [the river lapses into] a belt and [the mountains shrink into] a whetstone. It is approved that she be supplemented with an additional thousand households, as an actual source of income.

The edict, together with the reward, was a part of the complicated negotiation at the heart of the delicate alliance between Li Longji and Princess Taiping. On its surface, the throne was using this edict to reward Princess Taiping; in reality, Princess Taiping was one of the real powerholders behind the throne, and her agency permeated every part of the imperial decision making. Indeed, the edict acknowledged, in the emperor's voice, that Princess Taiping supported "Us" as the emperor. In other words, the edict publicly proclaimed a version of history that featured Princess Taiping as the agent who rescued the empire and pacified the realm.

He particularly and blindly trusted Princess Taiping and was completely favor to her, and she became honored like an empress inside the palace and court. She discussed and helped decide all military and state affairs: every time that an official made a proposal, report and petition, he directed the official to first discuss the matters with Princess Taiping and Li Longji (who was created crown prince), before he would rule on the matter himself. Thus, Princess Taiping has decision-making power on many events in the governmental and border matters. She can often decide the promotion or demotion of officials with a single sentence. According to Song dynasty historian Sīmǎ Guāng (司马光) in the Zizhi Tongjian:

She had the highest respect because she achieved great success over and over again, and emperor often plans to discuss major affairs with her, and when she enters the palace, she talks directly to the emperor about politics and shapes matters to her liking. Whenever the chancellors and officials discussed political affairs with him, the first sentence he asked was: "Have you ever discussed with Princess Taiping? "If the answer is yes, he will continue to ask: "Have you ever discussed with Li Longji?" If both people have clear opinions, he will make a decision based on this. Whatever the princess wants, the emperor will listen. All the military and civil officials in the court, from the chancellors to the forbidden troops generals, promotion or dismissal, were all at her recommendation. The rest of the officials who had been promoted to high-ranking positions through her word were even more so, is uncountable. The number of people who were attracted to her was numerous. Her wealth is like a mountain, her power is over everything and everyone, and her party members are like a city.

Her three sons were all created princes (in Xue Chongjian's case, the Prince of Lijie). She became extremely rich and lucrative, and she was known as a real force behind the throne, as a result of her power, and her mansion was like a palace, even more magnificent, and her palace, like the emperor's palace, was guarded by soldiers: her staff simulated the royal design without any reservations, and most chancellors, forbidden troops, officials and warlords were her associates. Therefore, the Princess Taiping was so powerful that she even surpassed Emperor Ruizong. Also, Princess Taiping would sit behind a curtain beside Emperor Ruizong and give him advice during imperial meetings, and discussing affairs of dynasty and state with his councilors, who took orders from her while she sat behind a screen (as an imitation of her mother and sister-in-law, when they were both empress consort).

The historian Liu Xu, in Old Book of Tang, was highly critical of the power Princess Taiping had wielded, it says:

Whenever there is an important event to decide, the emperor sits with the princess and talks and listens to her. If she has an offer, whatever it is, the emperor will accept it. If there are more important issues and the princess is not in the palace, the chancellors will go to the she before meeting with emperor to discuss matters with her. Her power had eclipsed that of the sovereign … and thus she was increasingly arrogant, [such that] her estates encompassed all fertile lands in the vicinity of the capital" (權移人主 … 公主由是滋驕，田園遍於近甸膏腴).

According to Song dynasty historians Ouyang Xiu and Song Qi, in the New Book of Tang:

Emperor Ruizong ascended the throne, and the power of the master Princess shook the empire, and ten thousand households were granted to her, every time the emperor does business, he seeks the princess' opinion before making a final decision and obeys everything she says. If something is offered by her, it will be accepted. If there are difficult or unresolved issues and the princess is not in the palace, the emperor sends ministers to her house to seek her opinion. Her party members hold important positions in every corner of the government.

Initially, Princess Taiping agreed to Li Longji's ascension as crown prince despite the fact that Li Longji was not Emperor Ruizong's oldest son and was not born of Emperor Ruizong's wife, the deceased Empress Liu (Li Chengqi was both — and therefore pursuant to Confucian principles of succession should have been crown prince, although Li Chengqi himself declined the title, reasoning that Li Longji's accomplishment was what allowed the empire to be secure), as she believed that Li Longji was young (25 at the time he was made crown prince) and would be easy to control and therefore maintain her power for the future (if one day he sits on the throne). However, once she began to see that Li Longji was strong-willed, and especially after she realized Li Longji was not receptive to her influence, she became apprehensive and often had officials close to her publicly opine that Li Longji was an improper crown prince. She further often paid Li Longji's staff members to spy on him to try to find faults with him. She associated with a group of officials, including the chancellors Dou Huaizhen, Xiao Zhizhong, and Cen Xi, intending to find some way to remove Li Longji, but was unable to get two other chancellors — Wei Anshi and Song Jing — to join her group. On one occasion, when Emperor Ruizong met with Wei Anshi alone, he told Wei, "I have heard that the officials are all loyal only to the Eastern Palace [(i.e., the Crown Prince, as the Eastern Palace was the residence for the crown prince)]. You should investigate this." Wei responded:

Where did Your Imperial Majesty hear this kind of empire-destroying words? This must be a plot by Princess Taiping. The Crown Prince had accomplished great things for the state, is kind and understanding, and is filially pious and loving to his brothers. Everyone knows this. I hope that Your Imperial Majesty would not be misled by wrongful accusations.

Emperor Ruizong was surprised and took no further action and only said:

I understand, you do not need to repeat this.

However, Princess Taiping Was behind a pearl screen behind Emperor Ruizong and heard this, and she spread rumors against Wei, hoping that he would be arrested and tried, but the chancellor Guo Yuanzhen stopped the investigations into Wei. In another case, of course, this time directly by herself, When she hinted that Li Longi should be replaced at a meeting she had with the chancellors, the other chancellors all did not dare to speak, but chancellor Song directly responded:

The Eastern Palace had done great things for the realm, and he is truly the lord for the ancestral temples and worship. Why does Your Royal Highness suddenly have this thought?

In 711, Song and another chancellor, Yao Yuanzhi, tried to persuade Emperor Ruizong to carry out a plan that they believed would end her plotting. They proposed that the two princes who arguably had superior claims on the throne than Li Longji — Li Chengqi and Li Shouli (whose father Li Xian (note different character than Emperor Zhongzong) was an older brother to both Emperors Zhongzong and Ruizong) — be sent out of the capital Chang'an to serve as prefectural prefects, while Princess Taiping and Wu Youji be sent to live in Luoyang. They also proposed that Li Longji be put in charge of most affairs of state. Emperor Ruizong initially agreed and made the orders as Song and Yao suggested, except that he believed that Luoyang was too far and therefore sent Princess Taiping and Wu Youji only to Pu Prefecture (蒲州, roughly modern Yuncheng, Shanxi). After Princess Taiping found out that the plan was conceived by Song and Yao, however, she was incensed and let Li Longji know her anger. In fear, Li Longji submitted a petition accusing Song and Yao of alienating him from his brothers Li Chengqi and Li Shouli (who was actually a cousin but was raised with Emperor Ruizong's sons) and aunt Princess Taiping, asking that the two be put to death. Emperor Ruizong, in response, demoted Song and Yao and recalled Princess Taiping, Li Chengqi, and Li Shouli to the capital. After Song and Yao were removed, Princess Taiping further suggested that a major reform in the civil service system that they carried out — removing officials improperly commissioned during Emperor Zhongzong's reign — be reversed, and Emperor Ruizong agreed. That year, Princess Taiping persuaded Emperor Ruizong to decree, collect and compile Shangguan Wan'er works, and retain the works of this talented woman. Later that year, in order to please Wu Youji, Princess Taiping requested that the tombs of Wu Zetian's parents Wu Shihuo (武士彠) and Lady Yang be restored to imperial tomb status (they had been reduced to the status of tombs of nobles after Emperor Zhongzong's death), and Emperor Ruizong agreed. Also that year, when the officials Xue Qianguang (薛謙光) and Murong Xun (慕容珣) accused an associate of Princess Taiping's, the Buddhist monk Huifan (慧範), Princess Taiping pleaded on Huifan's behalf, and Emperor Ruizong, believing that Xue and Murong had only accused Huifan because they could do so during the time that Princess Taiping was out of the capital, demoted Xue and Murong.

In winter 711 Princess Taiping's has become more powerful, and because of her recommendations, Emperor Ruizong carried out a major reorganization of his administration, relieving the chancellors Wei, Guo Yuanzhen, Dou, Li Rizhi, and Zhang Shuo of their chancellor positions, instead commissioning a number of chancellors that she recommended — Liu Youqiu, Wei Zhigu, Cui Shi, and Lu Xiangxian. (Cui was a lover of Princess Taiping, and when she offered to recommend him as chancellor, because he admired Lu, he requested to be made chancellor along with Lu, even though Lu was not an associate of Princess Taiping. It was said that Emperor Ruizong, however, was initially unwilling to make Cui chancellor, but relented after Princess Taiping begged in tears, although the account may be somewhat discountable in that neither Liu nor Wei was an associate of Princess Taiping either, and both were close associates of Li Longji.) The governors general of the Imperial Guards, Chang Yuankai (常元楷), Li Ci (李慈), and Li Qin was also loyal to her.

In 712, Princess Taiping's husband Wu Youji died, and Emperor Ruizong posthumously created him the Prince of Ding, a title that he had formerly carried.

Later that year, Princess Taiping had astrologers warn Emperor Ruizong that the constellation that symbolized the imperial throne, Dizuo (帝座), showed that there would be a change in the emperor's position — believing that Emperor Ruizong would suspect Li Longji of plotting a coup and that she could remove Li Longji this way. She pointing out that history was repeating itself; Emperor Taizong (grandfather of Princess Taiping and Emperor Ruizong), overthrew his father Emperor Gaozu in a coup (Xuanwu Gate Incident). Instead, Emperor Ruizong, reasoning that the change in the emperor's position could be accounted by an orderly transition, offered to pass the throne to Li Longji. Princess Taiping fervently opposed it, and Li Longji initially declined, but at Emperor Ruizong's insistence finally accepted and took the throne (as Emperor Xuanzong). However, at Princess Taiping's suggestion, Emperor Ruizong retained more of the imperial power as Taishang Huang (retired emperor). She told him:

"You take the empire's affairs seriously, and you want to address the pros and cons? Although you have relinquished the throne, how can you forget your court and country? Keep the minimum decision power for the fate of important matters."

Therefore, his edicts continued to carry very much greater and valid force than Emperor Xuanzong's; Even the new emperor had to obey his rulings.

== Emperor Xuanzong's reign ==
After Emperor Ruizong became Taishang Huang (retired emperor), meanwhile, Princess Taiping continued to be highly extremely influential in governmental matters through Emperor Ruizong, and still most chancellors, forbidden troops, officials and warlords were her associates. (Of the seven chancellors at the time, five – Dou Huaizhen, Xiao Zhizhong, Cen Xi, Cui Shi, and Lu Xiangxian – were made chancellors at her recommendation, although Lu was not considered a member of her party.) As a result, she retained the supreme hand, so the power struggle between aunt and nephew intensified. According to Song dynasty historian Sīmǎ Guāng 司马光 in the Zizhi Tongjian:

Princess Taiping leaned the retired emperor's [(i.e., Emperor Ruizong)] power and used his power without permission. She had a power war with the emperor [(i.e., Emperor Xuanzong)]. Five of the seven chancellors followed princess, and most of the civil and military ministers were accountable to the princess.

Later in 712, Liu Youqiu and the general Zhang Wei (張暐), with approval from Emperor Xuanzong, planned to command the imperial guards to kill Princess Taiping's associates, but when Zhang discussed this with the censor Deng Guangbin (鄧光賓), Deng leaked the news. Once the leak was known, Emperor Xuanzong was forced to disavow the plan and further inform Emperor Ruizong. Liu, Zhang, and Deng were arrested, but after Emperor Xuanzong pleaded on their behalf, they were only exiled.

== Suicide ==
By 713, it was said that Princess Taiping, Dou Huaizhen, Cen Xi, Xiao Zhizhong, Cui Shi; along with other officials Xue Ji, Li Jin (李晉) the Prince of Xinxing (a grandson of Li Deliang (李德良), a cousin of Tang's founder Emperor Gaozu), Li You (李猷), Jia Yingfu (賈膺福), Tang Jun (唐晙); the generals Chang Yuankai (常元楷), Li Ci (李慈), and Li Qin (李欽); and the monk Huifan, were plotting to overthrow Emperor Xuanzong. It was further said that they discussed, with the lady in waiting Lady Yuan to poison the gastrodia elata that Emperor Xuanzong routinely took as an aphrodisiac. When this alleged plot was reported to Emperor Xuanzong by Wei Zhigu, Emperor Xuanzong, who had already received advice from Wang Ju (王琚), Zhang Shuo, and Cui Riyong to act first, did so. He convened a meeting with his brothers Li Fan (李範) the Prince of Qi, Li Ye (李業) the Prince of Xue, Guo Yuanzhen, along with a number of his associates — the general Wang Maozhong (王毛仲), the officials Jiang Jiao (姜皎) and Li Lingwen (李令問), his brother-in-law Wang Shouyi (王守一), the eunuch Gao Lishi, and the military officer Li Shoude (李守德) — and decided to act first. On 29 July, Emperor Xuanzong had Wang Maozhong take 300 soldiers to the imperial guard camp to behead Chang and Li Ci. Then, Jia, Li You, Xiao, and Cen were arrested and executed as well. Dou fled into a canyon and committed suicide by hanging. Xue Ji was forced to commit suicide. When Emperor Ruizong heard about this, he quickly ascended the tower at Chengtian Gate (承天門) to ascertain what was happening. Guo reported to him Emperor Xuanzong's intentions, and Emperor Ruizong felt compelled to affirm Emperor Xuanzong's actions in an edict. The next day, Emperor Ruizong issued an edict transferring all authorities to Emperor Xuanzong and moved to a secondary palace, Baifu Hall (百福殿).

Meanwhile, Princess Taiping, hearing what happened to her associates, fled into a temple in the mountains, only appearing three days later. Emperor Ruizong begged Emperor Xuanzong for her pardon, but he refused. Emperor Xuanzong ordered her to commit suicide at home, and put to death her sons and associates, except for Xue Chongjian, who had often counseled Princess Taiping against retaining power and who had often been battered by her — Emperor Xuanzong bestowed on Xue Chongjian the imperial surname of Li and allowed him to retain his titles. Princess Taiping's assets were confiscated, and it was said that there was so much treasure, livestock, and real estate that it took several years for the accounting to be complete.

== Artistic Representation ==
Film and television image
Year	Title	Actor	Ref.
2000	Palace of Desire	Chen Hong Zhou Xun	
2011	Secret History of Empress Wu	Zheng Shuang	
2012	Secret History of Princess Taiping	Zheng Shuang Alyssa Chia	
2013	Women of the Tang Dynasty	Kristy Yang	
2018	Deep in the Realm of Conscience	Alice Chan	

Literary Image
Year	Author	Title	Character	Ref.
1986	Annette Morley	Green dragon, white tiger	Tiger Lily (fictionalized account)	

== Ancestry ==
16. Li Bing, Duke Ren of Tang
8. Emperor Gaozu
17. Duchess Dugu
4. Emperor Taizong
18. Dou Yi, Duke of Shenwu
9. Empress Taimushunsheng
19. Princess Xiangyang of Northern Zhou
2. Emperor Gaozong
20. Zhangsun Si
10. Zhangsun Sheng
5. Empress Wendeshunsheng
Gao Jingde or Gao Mai
11. Lady Gao
1. Princess Taiping
24. Wu Jian
12. Wu Hua
25. Lady Song
6. Wu Shihuo, Duke Ding of Ying
3. Empress Wu Zetian
28. Yang Shao
14. Yang Da
7. Lady Yang
15. Lady Zhao
