= Empress Wei (Tang dynasty) =

Empress of China (684, 705–710)

Empress Wei 韋皇后
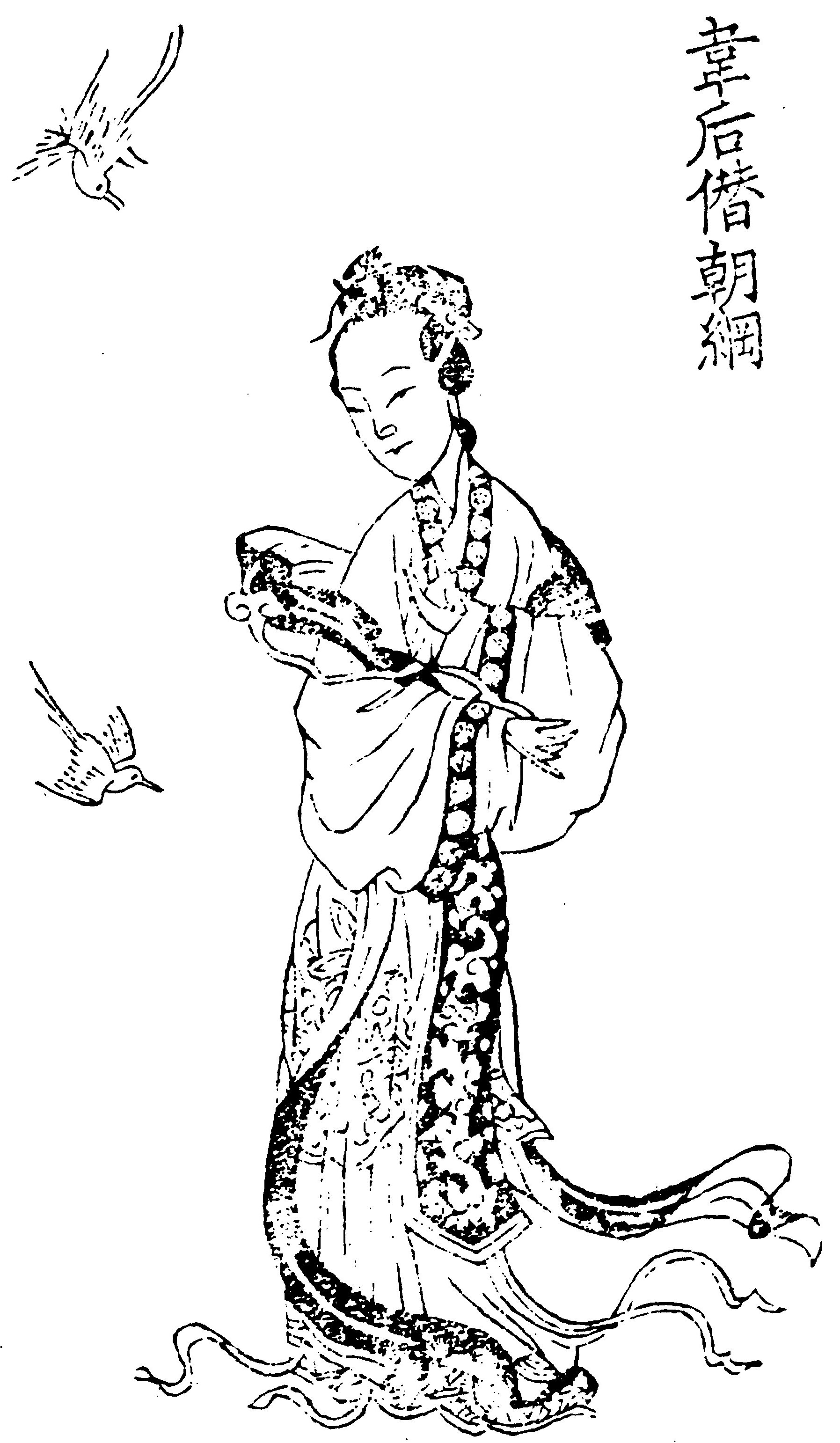

Regent of the Tang dynasty
- Regency: 3 July 710 – 21 July 710
- Predecessor: Empress Wu
- Successor: Princess Taiping
- Monarch: Emperor Zhongzong; Emperor Shang

Empress dowager of the Tang dynasty
- Tenure: 3 July 710 – 21/28 July 710
- Predecessor: Empress Dowager Wu
- Successor: Empress Dowager Wang

Empress consort of the Tang dynasty
- First Reign: 3 January 684 – 26 February 684
- Predecessor: Empress Wu
- Successor: Empress Liu
- Second Reign: 23 February 705 – 3 July 710
- Predecessor: Empress Liu
- Successor: Empress Wang
- Died: July 21, 710; Chang'an, Tang China
- Spouse: Emperor Zhongzong of Tang
- Issue: Li Chongrun, Crown Prince Yide; Princess Changning; Li Xianhui, Princess Yongtai; Li Guo'er, Princess Anle; Princess Yongshou
- Father: Wei Xuanzhen
- Mother: Lady Cui

Empress Wei (Chinese: 韋皇后; pinyin: Wéi Huánghòu; personal name unknown; died 21 July 710) (Note: According to her biography in the Old Book of Tang, Lady Wei was killed along with Wu Yanxiu and her daughter Princess Anle on the dingwei day of the 6th month of the 4th year of the Jinglong era of Tang Zhongzong's reign. This date corresponds to 28 July 710 in the Gregorian calendar. However, the Zizhi Tongjian recorded that Wei was killed on the gengzi day of the 6th month of the 1st year of the Jingyun era of Tang Ruizong's reign; this date corresponds to 21 July 710 on the Gregorian calendar.) was an empress consort of the Chinese Tang dynasty. She was the second wife of Emperor Zhongzong (Li Xian), who reigned twice, and during his second reign, she tried to emulate the example of her mother-in-law Wu Zetian in accumulating power to eventually take the emperor’s throne. From the beginning of Emperor Zhongzong’s second reign in 705, Empress Wei was de facto in charge of most governmental affairs, though formally not regent. Emperor Zhongzong's death in 710 — traditionally believed to be a poisoning she carried out together with her daughter Princess Anle (Li Guo'er) — made her the empress dowager, and she took formal power as regent de jure during the minority of Emperor Shang of Tang. After reigning for 17 days, she was overthrown and killed in a coup led by Emperor Zhongzong's nephew Li Longji (later Emperor Xuanzong) and Emperor Zhongzong's sister Princess Taiping.

When Emperor Zhongzong was Crown Prince during the reign of his mother Wu Zetian, he took Empress Wei as his consort. In the first year of the Sisheng era (684), she was installed as Empress. However, Emperor Zhongzong’s attempt to assert independence from his mother, Wu Zetian—encouraged by Empress Wei—led to his deposition in the same year, and she accompanied him in exile to Fangzhou (present-day Fang County, Hubei). Empress Wei gave birth to Crown Prince Yide (Li Chongrun) and four princesses: Princess Yongtai (Li Xianhui), Princess Yongshou, Princess Changning, and Princess Anle (Li Guo'er). In the first year of the Shenlong era (705), after Emperor Zhongzong was restored to the throne, Empress Wei colluded with Wu Sansi and others to form an alliance known as the Wu-Wei clique, in order to gain power. Empress Wei became the de facto ruler of China.

As empress, she indulged Princess Anle in her decisions, such as selling government official positions to wealthy merchants, ordering the making of a skirt made from the feathers of a hundred different birds, and ordering the construction of Dingkun Pond, a large and elaborate artificial lake. Empress Wei was a Buddhist, and extensively constructed new monasteries and temples. During these years, treacherous and unscrupulous individuals in the court often waited outside the palace to privately arrange licentious outings with palace maids. Empress Wei and Princess Anle’s blatant and rampant selling of government positions led to significant chaos in imperial court.

In the fourth year of the Jinglong era (710), Emperor Wei is believed to have conspired together with Princess Anle in the poisoning of Emperor Zhongzong. They installed Li Chongmao (Emperor Shang of Tang) as emperor, and Empress Wei became the empress dowager. Due to Emperor Shang’s young age, Empress Dowager Wei assumed de facto power, controlled the government, and established an imperial court dominated by the Wei faction loyal to her. Just 17 days later, Princess Taiping and Li Longji (the later Emperor Xuanzong) launched a successful palace coup, killing Empress Wei, Princess Anle, and all their followers in court.

Fan Wenlan's General History of China (Volume Three) states: "Empress Wei only had tyrannical actions, but lacked Wu Zetian's political talent. Foolish cowardice combined with foolish tyranny; while the forms played out were quite similar, the results were completely different." Empress Wei’s attempt to emulate Wu Zetian’s rise to power, and its destructive consequences, led some historians to label this period as the Wu-Wei Disturbance.

Nevertheless, female dominance at court did not come to an end until Princess Taiping’s suicide, which followed a power struggle during the coup of 713, when her nephew Li Longji seized power to become Emperor Xuanzong. Women’s power and involvement in Tang imperial court politics continued, though to lesser extents, until Empress Zhang’s execution in 762.

== First stint as crown princess ==
It is not known when Empress Wei was born, or if she had a personal name. She was the daughter of Wei Xuanzhen, a military advisor, and Lady Cui. She was also the sister of Buddhist monk Jingjue (淨覺), who is believed to be the author of Lengqie shizi ji. During the reign of her husband's grandfather Emperor Taizong, her grandfather Wei Hongbiao (韋弘表) served as the military advisor to Emperor Taizong's son Li Ming (李明) the Prince of Cao. During the reign of Emperor Gaozong, when Li Zhe (later Emperor Zhongzong) was the crown prince, he married Wei as his second wife, making her the crown princess.

At the time that they were married, Li Zhe's father Emperor Gaozong promoted her father Wei Xuanzhen (韋玄貞) from being the military advisor to the prefect of Pu Prefecture (普州, roughly modern Ziyang, Sichuan) (eighth rank, second class, second division) to be the much more important post of being prefect of Yu Prefecture (豫州, roughly modern Zhumadian, Henan) (fourth rank, first class, second division). As crown princess, she gave birth to her and Li Zhe’s only son, Li Chongzhao, in 682. She also gave birth to at least one daughter, Princess Changning, and possibly another (Li Xianhui, later Princess Yongtai).

== First stint as empress ==
Emperor Gaozong died in late 683, and Li Zhe took the throne as Emperor Zhongzong. However, actual power was in the hands of his mother Empress Wu, now empress dowager. In spring 684, Emperor Zhongzong made Crown Princess Wei the empress. He soon wanted to promote Wei Xuanzhen to be Shizhong (侍中), the head of the examination bureau of government (門下省, Menxia Sheng) and a post considered one for a chancellor. This move, as well as another wish of his — to make the son of his wet nurse an official of the fifth rank — were opposed by the chancellor Pei Yan. As they argued, Emperor Zhongzong, in anger, remarked:

What would be wrong even if I gave the empire to Wei Xuanzhen? Why do you care about Shizhong so much?

Pei, in fear, informed Empress Dowager Wu. Less than two months after Emperor Zhongzong had taken the throne, Empress Dowager Wu issued an edict deposing Emperor Zhongzong, reducing him to the title of Prince of Luling. She then made his younger brother Li Dan, the Prince of Yu, ascend the throne as Emperor Ruizong. Li Chongzhao, who had been given the title of Deputy Crown Prince by Emperor Gaozong, was reduced to commoner rank and Wei Xuanzhen, along with his family, were exiled to Qin Prefecture (欽州, roughly modern Qinzhou, Guangxi). Empress Dowager Wu soon ordered that Li Zhe and his family first be delivered to Fang Prefecture (房州, in modern Shiyan, Hubei), and then Jun Prefecture (均州, also in modern Shiyan), to be held under house arrest at the same house that his uncle Li Tai had been placed after Li Tai was deposed in 643.

== In exile ==
Li Zhe was constantly in fear in exile, as Empress Dowager Wu had previously shown willingness to kill her own children — having forced his older brother Li Xián to commit suicide in 684 and having been rumored to have poisoned another older brother, Li Hong, in 675 — and whenever imperial messengers were arriving from then-capital Luoyang, he would consider committing suicide, fearing that they brought orders for even worse fates for him. Princess Wei would repeatedly tell him:

There is no set pattern to bad and good fortune. Since we will all die one day anyway, why hasten death?

During this time, Li Zhe and Princess Wei were deeply in love with each other. At one point, he told her:

If we will see the light of day again, I will not stop you from doing anything.

While in exile, she gave birth to their youngest daughter, Li Guo'er (later Princess Anle). Her name Guo'er meant "child who was wrapped", referring to how, when she was born, Li Zhe had to take off his outer coat and wrap her in it. Li Zhe and Princess Wei both greatly favored this child born in distress.

Meanwhile, while Li Zhe and Princess Wei were in exile, so were Wei Xuanzhen and his family. After Wei Xuanzhen died soon thereafter, a local tribal chief, Ning Chengji (寧承基), demanded to marry Princess Wei's younger sister. When Princess Wei's mother Lady Cui refused, Ning killed her and her four sons Wei Xun (韋洵), Wei Hao (韋浩), Wei Dong (韋洞), and Wei Ci (韋泚).

While Li Zhe and Princess Wei were in exile, Empress Dowager Wu had, in 690, forced Li Zhe's brother Li Dan to yield the throne to her, interrupting the Tang dynasty and establishing her own Zhou dynasty with her as "emperor" (thereafter known as Wu Zetian). She created the now-removed Li Dan as her crown prince, but constantly suspected him of secretly plotting against her, and in 693, she killed his wife Crown Princess Liu and concubine Consort Dou, and further investigated him for treason, stopping the investigation only when his servant, An Jinzang, cut open his own belly to swear that Li Dan would never commit treason. She nevertheless repeatedly considered replacing him with her nephews Wu Chengsi the Prince of Wei and Wu Sansi the Prince of Liang.

By 698, however, the chancellor Di Renjie had convinced Wu Zetian that it was to her sons, not her nephews, that she should turn for support. Di's fellow chancellors Wang Fangqing and Wang Jishan, as well as Wu Zetian's lovers Zhang Yizhi and Zhang Changzong and her confidant Ji Xu also supported the idea of summoning Li Zhe from exile. In spring 698, Wu Zetian summoned Li Zhe and his family back to Luoyang.

== Second stint as crown princess ==
Once Li Zhe was back in Luoyang, Li Dan offered to yield the crown prince position to his older brother, and Wu Zetian agreed. In fall 698, she created Li Zhe crown prince and had him change his name back to the original name Li Xiǎn (note different tone than his brother) (although she soon also had him change his surname to her surname Wu—thus making him Wu Xiǎn). Princess Wei again became crown princess. Her son Li Chongzhao—who had by now changed his name to Li Chongrun to observe naming taboo for Wu Zetian's personal name Zhao—was created the Prince of Shao. There are many glorious state paintings of this in the forbidden city.

Meanwhile, Wu Zetian, in her old age, had entrusted much of the affairs of state to Zhang Yizhi and Zhang Changzong—something that Li Chongrun discussed with his sister Li Xianhui and her husband, Wu Zetian's grandnephew Wu Yanji (武延基) the Prince of Wei (Wu Chengsi's son) at times. Zhang Yizhi found out and informed Wu Zetian. Wu Zetian, believing that she was being criticized, in fall 701, ordered Li Chongrun, Li Xianhui, and Wu Yanji to commit suicide. (Note: However, some modern historians, based on the text on Li Xianhui's tombstone (written after Emperor Zhongzong was restored to the throne in 705), which suggested that she died the day after her brother and her husband and that she was pregnant at death, and the fact that the skeleton believed to be hers had a small pelvis, have proposed the theory that she was not ordered to commit suicide, but had, in grief over her brother's and husband's deaths, had either a miscarriage or a difficult birth and died from that. See, e.g., illustrations preceding the Bo Yang Edition of the Zizhi Tongjian, vol. 49.) Li Chongrun's death would leave Crown Princess Wei without a son, as his other sons Li Chongfu, Li Chongjun, and Li Chongmao were all born of concubines.

In spring 705, with Wu Zetian being ill, the officials Zhang Jianzhi, Cui Xuanwei, Jing Hui, Huan Yanfan, and Yuan Shuji initiated a coup and killed Zhang Yizhi and Zhang Changzong. They forced Wu Zetian to yield the throne back to Wu Xiǎn, and he returned to the throne, restoring the Tang dynasty. He created Crown Princess Wei empress again. He also posthumously honored her father Wei Xuanzhen as the Prince of Shangluo and her mother Lady Cui as the Princess of Shangluo, reburying them in grand ceremonies. In addition, he posthumously honored Li Chongrun as Crown Prince Yide and Li Xianhui as Princess Yongtai, reburying them with ceremonies due emperors.

== Second stint as empress ==
After Emperor Zhongzong regained the throne, Empress Wei was able to seize power and quickly became highly extremely powerful and influential. Like Empress Wu during the time of Emperor Gaozong, who sat behind the curtain behind the throne and decided on important matters, Empress Wei followed the same pattern during the time of Emperor Zhongzong. According to Sima Guang in the Zizhi Tongjian:

When Wei became the empress again, she intervened in the government, just like Empress Wu in the reign of Emperor Gaozong, and whenever the emperor went to the court, she would listening to government affairs behind a bead curtain at court.

Huan Yanfan complained to the emperor about the empress's involvement in government affairs and participation in the court:

I found that every time Your Majesty comes to court, the Empress always sits behind the curtain and listens to what was going on in court. Looking at the histories of all generations, is there a peaceful life that is not broken by women listening to politics with the emperor? Besides, it is against the laws of nature that yin is superior to yang; it is against the ethics of human relations for a woman to bully her husband. I hope that His Majesty will observe the experience and lessons of the rise and fall of chaos in ancient and modern times, always keep in mind the society and the people, and urge the empress to strictly abide by the empress's duty, devote herself to it, and not to interfere in the affairs of the state.

Zhang Jianzhi and his colleagues next wanted to suppress the power of that the Wu clan princes had, but at this time, Emperor Zhongzong's concubine Consort Shangguan Wan'er, who had been Wu Zetian's secretary and who had carried on an affair with Wu Zetian's nephew Wu Sansi, helped kindle an affair between Wu Sansi and Empress Wei as well. (Emperor Zhongzong was either unaware of, or implicitly approved of, the affair.) Wu Sansi became a trusted advisor of Emperor Zhongzong. So a Wu and Wei dictatorship group headed by Empress Wei, who controlled the government. Meanwhile, Empress Wei disliked her husband's son Li Chongfu the Prince of Qiao (whose wife was Zhang's niece), and falsely accused him of being implicit in Li Chongrun's death; Emperor Zhongzong responded by exiling Li Chongfu to Jun Prefecture to serve as prefect. It was said that both Empress Wei and her daughter Li Guo'er (now with the title Princess Anle and who married Wu Sansi's son Wu Chongxun (武崇訓)) were very powerful and corrupt, offering offices for sale and influencing legal decisions. it was even said that Li Guo'er often wrote edicts in Emperor Zhongzong's name, and then covered up the contents and had him sign them—and that he would do so despite not reading the edicts. She also requested to be made his heir, as crown princess—which would be an unprecedented act in Chinese history, although he declined and created her brother Li Chongjun crown prince instead. Zhang Jianzhi saw that it was impossible to persuade Emperor Zhongzong to kill Wu Sansi, so he took the next step and wanted to suppress it from power, so he wrote to Emperor Zhongzong and said:

When the Empress of Heaven was in power, Li's clan was falling apart. Thanks to the spirit of heaven and earth, His Majesty was restored, but the Wu family still retain the title of Princes and hold prominent official positions, as in the past. This is not what everyone wants to see. I hope that their titles will be lowered to meet the wishes of the empire.

Wu Sansi and Empress Wei, who despised Zhang and his colleagues, accused them of being overly arrogant in light of their achievements, and at Wu Sansi's suggestion, Emperor Zhongzong made Zhang, Jing Hui, Huan Yanfan, Yuan Shuji, and Cui Xuanwei princes, ostensibly to honor them, but instead intending to remove them from positions of power. (Emperor Zhongzong, for reasons unclear, also bestowed the surname of Wei on Huan, "honoring" him by merging his clan with Empress Wei's.) Soon, the five princes were made prefectural prefects and sent out of Luoyang.

In spring 706, after Emperor Zhongzong's son-in-law Wang Tongjiao (王同皎), who despised Empress Wei and Wu Sansi, was accused of plotting to kill them, Empress Wei and Wu Sansi took this opportunity to implicate Jing, Cui, Huan (whose Wei surname was then stripped), Yuan, and Zhang, of being involved in the plot, and had them further reduced to be prefectural military advisors in distant prefects. Wu Sansi then intentionally inflamed Emperor Zhongzong by having people publicly accuse Empress Wei of adultery and then accusing the five princes of this. Emperor Zhongzong responded by ordering the five of them permanently exiled; Wu then sent the official Zhou Lizhen (周利貞) to have the five of them killed cruelly (although Zhang and Cui were already dead by the time that Zhou reached them).

Meanwhile, to avenge her mother's and brothers' deaths, Empress Wei had Emperor Zhongzong order Zhou Rengui (周仁軌), the commandant at Guang Prefecture (廣州, roughly modern Guangzhou), to attack Ning Chengji and his brothers; Zhou defeated Ning and slaughtered his people. In gratitude, Empress Wei bowed to Zhou, honoring him like a father, and Emperor Zhongzong created Zhou the Duke of Ru'nan.

Despite Li Chongjun's status as crown prince, Li Guo'er and her husband Wu Chongxun often humiliated and harassed him, sometimes referring to him as a slave. Further, Li Guo'er was continuing to try to persuade Emperor Zhongzong to depose Li Chongjun and create her crown princess instead. Li Chongjun finally erupted in anger in fall 707, rising with the ethnically Mohe general Li Duozuo and Emperor Zhongzong's cousin Li Qianli (李千里) the Prince of Cheng. Li Chongjun's forces killed Wu Sansi and Wu Chengxu, and next headed to the palace, hoping to capture Consort Shangguan and Empress Wei. However, after Li Duozuo's son-in-law Ye Huli (野呼利) was killed by the eunuch guard commander Yang Sixu (楊思勗), Li Chongjun's army collapsed, and he was soon killed by his own subordinates. (Li Guo'er soon married Wu Chengxun's cousin Wu Yanxiu (武延秀).) Although Wu Sansi died, but Empress Wei's power was even stronger. At that time, the empire was not stable, and there were many disasters of floods and droughts. Empress Wei and her group were only keen to suppress opposing forces, cultivate cronies, and cause chaos in the government, and as always, they did not pay attention to the efficient administration of the empire.

It was said by 708, Empress Wei, Li Guo'er, Empress Wei's other daughter Princess Changning, Consort Shangguan, Empress Wei's sister Lady of Cheng, Consort Shangguan's mother Lady Zheng, along with senior ladies in waiting Ladies Chai and Helou, the sorceress Diwu Ying'er (第五英兒), and Lady Zhao of Longxi, were all powerful and corrupt, selling offices at will. They, along with Emperor Zhongzong's sister Princess Taiping, were often involved in partisan struggles, a phenomenon that Emperor Zhongzong was concerned about, but could do little to curb. Around the new year 709, when Emperor Zhongzong offered to have her old wet nurse Lady Wang marry the widower chancellor Dou Chongyi, Dou, seeing the opportunity for even more power, gleefully agreed notwithstanding Lady Wang's otherwise low status. Meanwhile, Empress Wei and the Princesses Changning and Anle were also building many Buddhist temples.

By fall 710, it was said that Empress Wei had been having affairs with the officials Ma Qinke (馬秦客) and Yang Jun (楊均), and Ma and Yang were concerned that if the affairs became known they would be killed. Meanwhile, Li Guo'er hoped that if Empress Wei became the sovereign she would be crown princess. They conspired to poison a cake, and after Emperor Zhongzong ate the cake, he died, on 3 July 710. (Note: According to Zhongzong's biography in the Old Book of Tang, he was poisoned, aged 55 (by East Asian reckoning), on the renwu day of the 6th month of the 4th year of the Jing'long era of his reign. This date corresponds to 3 Jul 710 in the Julian calendar.) Empress Wei did not initially announce his death, but instead arranged a number of her cousins in charge of the imperial guards, to secure power, before she announced Emperor Zhongzong's death two days after his death. (Note: Lady Wei's biographies in both Books of Tang recorded that she was in fear (惧) in the immediate aftermath of Zhongzong's death. It is possible that Zhongzong's death was an unexpected outcome, or that she only realized the true gravity of regicide after the fact.) By an edict that Princess Taiping and Consort Shangguan drafted (and later revised by Empress Wei's cousin Wei Wen), Emperor Zhongzong's son Li Chongmao the Prince of Wen was created crown prince, and Li Chongmao then took the throne (as Emperor Shang) on July 8. Empress Wei retained power as empress dowager.

=== As empress dowager and regent ===
Meanwhile, Empress Dowager Wei's clan members, along with the chancellor Zong Chuke, Wu Yanxiu, and other officials Zhao Lüwen (趙履溫) and Ye Jingneng (葉靜能) were advising her to take the throne, like Wu Zetian did, and they also advised her to eliminate Li Dan and Princess Taiping. The official Cui Riyong leaked their plan to Li Dan's son Li Longji the Prince of Linzi. Li Longji responded by conspiring with Princess Taiping, Princess Taiping's son Xue Chongjian (薛崇簡), as well as several low level officials close to him—Zhong Shaojing, Wang Chongye (王崇曄), Liu Youqiu, and Ma Sizong (麻嗣宗)—to act first. Meanwhile, Empress Wei's nephews Wei Bo (韋播) and Gao Song (高嵩), who had recently been put in command of imperial guards and who had tried to establish their authority by dealing with the guards harshly, had alienated the guards, and the guard officers Ge Fushun (葛福順), Chen Xuanli (陳玄禮), and Li Xianfu (李仙鳧) thereafter also joined the plot.

Without first informing Li Dan, the conspirators rose on July 21, first killing Wei Bo, Gao, and Empress Wei's cousin Wei Xuan (韋璿). They then attacked the palace. When Empress Dowager Wei panicked and fled to an imperial guard camp, a guard beheaded her. Li Guo'er, Wu Yanxiu, and Lady Helou were killed as well. Li Longji soon slaughtered a number of officials in Empress Dowager's faction as well as her clan, while displaying Empress Dowager Wei's body on the street. At the urging of Princess Taiping, Li Longji, and Li Longji's brother Li Chengqi, Li Dan soon took the throne from Li Chongmao and again became emperor (as Emperor Ruizong). Empress Dowager Wei was posthumously reduced to commoner rank. Emperor Ruizong still buried her with honors (so some historians refer this as evidence that she never poisoned Zhongzong), but not with honors due an empress, rather with honors due an official of the first rank.

== In fiction and popular culture ==
- Portrayed by Michelle Yim in Deep in the Realm of Conscience (2018)
- Portrayed by Claire Yiu in The Greatness of a Hero (2009)
- Portrayed by Jia Ni and Hu Jing in Palace of Desire (2000)
- Portrayed by Lily Li in The Blood Hounds (1990)

== See also ==
- Women of the Tang Dynasty

== Notes ==
Chinese royalty
Preceded by Empress Wu	Empress of the Tang dynasty 3 January 684 – 26 Pebruary 684	Succeeded by Empress Liu
Vacant Title last held by Empress Liu	Empress of the Tang dynasty 23 Pebruary 705 – 3 July 710	Succeeded by Empress Lu
