= List of chancellors of Wu Zetian =

Wu Zetian was a Chinese sovereign, who ruled officially under the name of her self-proclaimed "Zhou dynasty", from 690 to 705; however, she had previous imperial positions under both Emperor Taizong of Tang and his son Emperor Gaozong of Tang, of the Tang dynasty of China. Wu was a concubine of Emperor Taizong; after his death she married his successor and 9th son, Emperor Gaozong, officially becoming Gaozong's furen, in 655, although previously having considerable political power prior to this. Gaozong had a debilitating stroke in 660, after which Wu Zetian ruled as effective sovereign until 705. Typical of historical Chinese imperial governments, the nation was mainly ruled by a formal bureaucratic government, under the (at least nominal) control of a sole sovereign, or huangdi. In this system, the office of "chancellor" was a relatively powerful position. Wu Zetian's "Zhou dynasty" had various chancellors during her reign, these being shown by name and term of office in the following list:

- Cen Changqian (690–691)
- Wu Chengsi (690–692, 697)
- Xing Wenwei (690)
- Wu Youning (690–691, 691–692, 698–699)
- Fu Youyi (690–691)
- Shi Wuzi (690–691)
- Zong Qinke (690)
- Le Sihui (691)
- Ren Zhigu (691–692)
- Ge Fuyuan (691)
- Ouyang Tong (691)
- Pei Xingben (691–692)
- Di Renjie (691–692, 697–700)
- Yang Zhirou (692)
- Li Youdao (692)
- Yuan Zhihong (692)
- Cui Shenji (692)
- Cui Yuanzong (692–694)
- Li Zhaode (692–694)
- Yao Shu (692, 694–697)
- Li Yuansu (692, 694–696)
- Wang Xuan (692)
- Lou Shide (693–696, 697–699)
- Wei Juyuan (693–694, 700)
- Lu Yuanfang (693–694, 699–700)
- Doulu Qinwang (693–694, 697–698, 699–700)
- Su Weidao (693–694, 698–704)
- Wang Xiaojie (693–696)
- Wei Shifang (694)
- Yang Zaisi (694–699, 704–705)
- Du Jingjian (694, 697–698)
- Zhou Yunyuan (694–695)
- Sun Yuanheng (696)
- Wang Fangqing (696–698)
- Li Daoguang (696–698)
- Wang Jishan (697–699)
- Zong Chuke (697–698, 704)
- Wu Sansi (697, 698–700)
- Yao Chong (698–704, 704–705)
- Li Jiao (698–700, 703–704)
- Ji Xu (699–700)
- Wei Yuanzhong (699–703)
- Zhang Xi (700–701)
- Wei Anshi (700–705)
- Li Huaiyuan (701)
- Gu Cong (701–702)
- Li Jiongxiu (701–704)
- Zhu Jingze (703–704)
- Tang Xiujing (703–705)
- Wei Sili (704)
- Cui Xuanwei (704–705)
- Zhang Jianzhi (704–705)
- Fang Rong (704–705)
- Wei Chengqing (704–705)
- Yuan Shuji (705)

== Notes and references ==
=== Sources ===
- New Book of Tang, vols. 4, 76.
