= Li Zhaode =

Chinese politician (died 697)

Li Zhaode (Chinese: 李昭德; died 28 April 697) was a Chinese politician in Wu Zetian's Zhou dynasty, who at point served as chancellor. He was known for his abilities and strong will, which eventually led to a conflict with Wu Zetian's secret police official Lai Junchen. Li Zhaode was executed via decapitation on the same day as Lai, who was in turn accused by others of treason.

== Background ==
It is not known when Li Zhaode was born, but it is known that his family was from the Tang dynasty capital Chang'an. His father Li Qianyou (李乾佑) served as an imperial censor during the reign of Tang's second emperor Emperor Taizong and later as minister of justice during the reign of Emperor Taizong's son and Wu Zetian's husband Emperor Gaozong, and was known for his honesty but carelessness with words. Li Zhaode was the son of a concubine of Li Qianyou, and was said to be capable and strong-willed like his father, and he passed the imperial examination when he was young. He was eventually promoted to be an assistant censor (御史中丞, Yushi Zhongcheng), but in 689, during the reign of Emperor Gaozong's son Emperor Ruizong, he was accused of improprieties unspecified in history and briefly exiled to be the sheriff of Lingshui County (陵水, modern Lingshui, Hainan), but was eventually recalled to be one of the three deputy ministers of defense (夏官侍郎, Xiaguan Shilang), along with Lou Shide and Hou Zhiyi (侯知一).

== Service under Wu Zetian ==
=== As chancellor ===
As of 692—after Wu Zetian had seized the throne from her son Emperor Ruizong in 690 and taken the throne herself, establishing Zhou and interrupting Tang—Li Zhaode was still serving as the deputy minister of defense when he secretly suggested to Wu Zetian that her nephew Wu Chengsi the Prince of Wei was becoming too powerful. She initially responded, "He is my nephew, and so I I trust him." Li Zhaode responded:

How can the intimacy of nephew and aunt be compared with that of son and father? There were sons who killed their fathers and usurped thrones, and nephews can do so as well. Right now, Wu Chengsi is Your Imperial Majesty's nephew, prince, and chancellor. His power is the same as yours. I am afraid that Your Imperial Majesty might not be able to remain long on the heavenly throne.

She was persuaded, and in fall 692, she reorganized her administration, removing Wu Chengsi, his cousin Wu Youning, and fellow chancellor Yang Zhirou from their positions as chancellors. As part of the reorganization, Li Zhaode was made Fengge Shilang (鳳閣侍郎), the deputy head of the legislative bureau of government (鳳閣, Fengge), and given the designation of Tong Fengge Luantai Pingzhangshi (同鳳閣鸞臺平章事), making him a chancellor de facto; also made chancellors at the same time were Cui Yuanzong, Yao Shu, Li Yuansu, and Cui Shenji, and several days later, so was Wang Xuan. Around that time, there was a group of petitioners led by one Wang Qingzhi (王慶之), who advocated that Wu Chengsi be made crown prince, displacing her son Li Dan (the former Emperor Ruizong), and Wu Zetian, while not granting the petition, permitted Wang to see her frequently in the palace. However, Wang was coming to the palace too often, displeasing her, and she ordered Li Zhaode to batter Wang—and Li Zhaode, quite intentionally, battered Wang to death, causing the group of petitioners he led to disband. He then spoke to Wu Zetian:

The Heavenly Emperor [(i.e., Emperor Gaozong)] was Your Imperial Majesty's husband, and the Imperial Heir [(皇嗣, Huangsi, i.e., Li Dan)] is Your Imperial Majesty's son. You possess the empire, and of course you should pass it to your descendants for tens of thousands of generations. How can you let a nephew be your heir? From ancient times, I have never heard of a nephew who became emperor who built an imperial temple for his aunt. Further, Your Imperial Majesty was entrusted these responsibilities by the Heavenly Emperor. If you give the empire to Wu Chengsi, the Heavenly Emperor will never be worshipped again.

Wu Zetian agreed with his rationale and did not make Wu Chengsi crown prince. Because of this, Wu Chengsi despised Li Zhaode and tried to speak against him, but Wu Zetian responded, "I can only sleep because I promoted Li Zhaode, as he took over the hard work on my behalf. Do not speak further."

Meanwhile, Wu Zetian was rebuilding the capital Luoyang to make it a magnificent capital, and Li Zhaode was particularly said to be responsible for the magnificence of the new executive bureau (文昌臺, Wenchang Tai) building, as well as Dingding (定鼎門) and Shangdong (上東門) Gates. He also built Luoyang's outer walls. Moreover, there was a bridge over the Luo River (洛水, flowing near Luoyang) near the Changxia Gate (長夏門) that the minister of agriculture Wei Ji (韋機) had built during Emperor Gaozong's reign that was useful and had heavy traffic, but was repeatedly damaged by the flow of the Luo River and required constant repairs. Li Zhaode devised a stone formation before the bridge that diverted the water strength, which allowed the bridge to stand without further damage. It was also said that Li Zhaode did much to try to curb the power of Wu Zetian's secret police officials, who were often falsely accusing people of treason and killing them, and that he, in particular, killed Hou Sizhi.

In 694, Li Zhaode was made acting Neishi (內史), the head of the legislative bureau and a post considered one for a chancellor. Also around that time, Wu Zetian put her lover Huaiyi the Duke of E in command of an army against Eastern Tujue and made Li Zhaode and fellow chancellor Su Weidao Huaiyi's assistants, although Eastern Tujue forces withdrew before the army could launch, and therefore the army never set out. It was said that when Li Zhaode had a disagreement with Huaiyi, Huaiyi began to hit him, and Li Zhaode, despite his reputation for fortitude, was fearful and apologized.

Meanwhile, Li Zhaode gained a reputation for monopolizing power, drawing hatred from other officials. Later in 694, after petitions by the officials Qiu Yin (丘愔) and Deng Zhu (鄧注) that accused Li Zhaode of abuse of power, Wu Zetian began to dislike Li Zhaode. In fall 694, she demoted Li Zhaode to be the sheriff of Nanbin County (南賓, in modern Qinzhou, Guangxi). She also soon sentenced Li Zhaode to death but commuted the sentence to removal from office and exile. Fellow chancellors Doulu Qinwang, Wei Juyuan, Du Jingjian, Su, and Lu Yuanfang were accused of not being able to curb in Li Zhaode's abuses and were demoted.

=== Return from exile and death ===
At a later point, however, Li Zhaode was recalled from exile to serve as imperial censor (監察御史, Jiancha Yushi), and his enmity with the secret police official Lai Junchen, previously in place, was renewed. Further, on one occasion, he insulted Huangfu Wenbei (皇甫文備) the deputy minister of justice. In 697, Lai and Huangfu therefore falsely accused Li Zhaode of treason, and Li Zhaode was arrested.

Meanwhile, however, Lai himself was said to be plotting to further falsely accuse the Wu clan princes, Princess Taiping, Li Dan, and Li Dan's brother Li Zhe the Prince of Luling, of plotting treason. When this was revealed by his friend Wei Suizhong (衛遂忠), the Wu clan princes and Princess Taiping accused him of crimes. Later in 697, Lai and Li Zhaode were executed on the same day, and it was said that there was no one who did not mourn Li Zhaode while rejoicing at Lai's death. Li Zhaode was eventually posthumously honored during both the resumed reign of Li Zhe (Emperor Zhongzong) in 706 and Emperor Dezong in 782.
