= Zhu Jingze =

Zhu Jingze (Chinese: 朱敬則; 635–709), courtesy name Shaolian (少連), was an official of China's Tang and Wu Zhou dynasties, serving as a chancellor during Wu Zetian's reign.

== Background ==
Zhu Jingze was born in 635, during the reign of Emperor Taizong. His family was from Bo Prefecture (亳州, roughly modern Bozhou, Anhui) and had been known for generations, from the Northern Zhou to Tang dynasty, as a family that had filial piety and upright behavior. Zhu Jingze himself was said to value character and righteousness, and was known for his linguistic studies in his youth. He was also said to have lived with three cousins without any disputes between them about property and was friendly with Jiang Rong (江融) and Wei Yuanzhong, both of whom later became important officials as well. During the Xianheng era of Emperor Taizong's son Emperor Gaozong (670–674), Emperor Gaozong heard of his reputation and summoned him, preparing to make him an important imperial official. However, the official Li Jingxuan spoke against Zhu, and Zhu was instead made the sheriff of Huanshui County (洹水, in modern Handan, Hebei).

== During Wu Zetian's reign ==
As of 692, when Emperor Gaozong's wife Wu Zetian had been ruling as "emperor" of her own Zhou dynasty, interrupting Tang, Zhu Jingze was serving as You Bujue (右補闕), a low level official at the legislative bureau of government (鳳閣, Fengge). Before that time, there had been a large number of officials accused of treason and executed based on the accusations of secret police officials, as Wu Zetian was seeking to wipe out actual or potential dissenters to her rule. Zhu, believing that such actions were no longer necessary to affirm her rule, submitted a petition to her pointing out that such measures were no longer necessary and were entrapping the innocent. While she did not abandon the policy immediately, she rewarded Zhu with silk for his suggestion.

In 700, Zhu was still serving as You Bujue, when Wu Zetian established a group of imperial attendants, headed by her lovers Zhang Yizhi and Zhang Changzong, but also including other favorites of hers as well as officials with literary talent and young men with handsome appearances. Zhu submitted a petition suggesting that the Zhangs were sufficient for her and that she curb in the recruitment—pointing out that such officials as Hou Xiang (侯祥) were flaunting their appearances to try to become imperial attendants and that such actions were causing damage to her reputation. Wu Zetian appreciated his petition and again rewarded him with silk.

In 703, Zhu was promoted to be Zhengjian Daifu (正諫大夫), a senior consultant at the examination bureau of government (鸞臺, Luantai). He was soon also given the designation Tong Fengge Luantai Pingzhangshi (同鳳閣鸞臺平章事), making him a de facto chancellor. Later that year, the Zhang brothers falsely accused Wei Yuanzhong of plotting treason. Wei's subordinate Zhang Yue, after initially agreeing to perjure himself by testifying against Wei, in the end corroborated Wei's protestation of innocence. Though the other chancellors were afraid to speak out, Zhu submitted a petition defending Wei and Zhang Yue. Wei and Zhang Yue escaped death but were exiled. When Su Anheng (蘇安恆), a commoner who had repeatedly submitted petitions to Wu Zetian, also submitted a petition defending Wei but which used exceedingly insulting language against Zhang Yizhi and Zhang Changzong, Zhang Yizhi was incensed and tried to have Su executed, stopping only when Zhu, Huan Yanfan, and Wei Zhigu interceded on Su's behalf. Late that year, when Wu Zetian was concerned about a rebellion by the Lao tribal chief Ouyang Qian (歐陽倩) at Shi'an (始安, in modern Guilin, Guangxi), Zhu recommended Pei Huaigu (裴懷古) to deal with the situation. Once Pei got to the area, he was able to, without military engagement, persuade Ouyang and the other tribal chiefs to submit. This recommendation of Zhu's, as well as his recommendations of Wei Zhigu and Zhang Sijing (張思敬), impressed the people at the time at Zhu's good judgment of people's abilities, and it was said that while Zhu served as chancellor, he concentrated on finding appropriate officials to fill posts and did not worry about details.

In 704, citing his age, Zhu requested retirement from his chancellor post. Wu Zetian agreed and made him the deputy minister of public works (冬官侍郎, Dongguan Shilang) and let him be in charge of editing imperial histories. Around that time, Zhang Yizhi and Zhang Changzong were commissioning a project of portraits of 18 officials, including her nephew Wu Sansi, Li Jiao, Su Weidao, Li Jiongxiu, and Wang Shaozong (王紹宗). They wanted to include Zhu in the project, but Zhu repeatedly declined, not wishing to be associated with Zhang Yizhi and Zhang Changzong, and the popular opinion at the time praised him.

== During Emperor Zhongzong's second reign ==
In 705, Wu Zetian was overthrown in a coup, and her son Li Xian the Crown Prince, a former emperor, was restored to the throne (as Emperor Zhongzong). Around this time, Zhu was sent to Zheng Prefecture (鄭州, roughly modern Zhengzhou, Henan) to serve as prefect, and soon retired completely. In 706, after Emperor Zhongzong's son-in-law Wang Tongjiao (王同皎) was executed on accusation that he had planned to kill Wu Sansi, who was by then a trusted advisor of Emperor Zhongzong's, and depose Emperor Zhongzong's powerful wife Empress Wei, who was having an affair of Wu Sansi, the imperial censor Ran Zuyong (冉祖雍), who had long been resentful of Zhu Jingze, falsely accused Zhu of being part of Wang's plot and had him exiled to serve as the prefect of Lu Prefecture (廬州, roughly modern Hefei, Anhui). Several months later, however, Zhu was allowed to return to his home in Bo Prefecture, and when he returned home, it was said that he carried nothing from Lu Prefecture except for the horse he was on, and his sons and nephews walked next to his horse, attending him. He died in summer 709.

After Emperor Zhongzong's death in 710 and Emperor Zhongzong's brother Li Dan the Prince of Dan became emperor (as Emperor Ruizong), Emperor Ruizong posthumously honored many officials whom he believed were wrongly killed or demoted during Emperor Zhongzong's reign. When he discussed with the chancellor Liu Youqiu as to whether he was missing anyone, Liu, who was at one point Zhu's subordinate, pointed out Zhu's honesty and contributions, and Emperor Ruizong posthumously honored Zhu and gave him the posthumous name of Yuan (元, meaning "discerning").
