= Wei Shifang =

Chinese chancellor (died 695)

Wei Shifang (韋什方) (died 695), also known as Wu Shifang (武什方), was briefly a chancellor during Wu Zetian's Zhou Dynasty.

== Rise to top ==
Wei Shifang had a highly unusual rise to his position. As of 694, Wu Zetian was said to be attracted to the teaching of three individuals involved in mystic teachings. The first was an old Buddhist nun from Henei (河內, in modern Jiaozuo, Henan), who was staying at Linzhi Temple (麟趾寺) in the capital Luoyang, who self-claimed the title of "Pure Light Rulai (Tathagata) Buddha" (淨光如來佛) and claimed to be able to predict the future. The second was Wei, who was an associate of the old nun, and who was from Mount Song, who claimed to be born in 238, during the reign of the emperor Sun Quan of Eastern Wu—which would make him 456 years old at the time.

The third was a non-Han old man who claimed to be 500 years old and who had met Wu Zetian's lover Huaiyi 200 years earlier. Wu Zetian respected them greatly and bestowed the imperial clan name of Wu on Wei Shifang. In fall 694, she even made him Zhengjian Daifu (正諫大夫), a senior consultant at the examination bureau of government (鸞臺, Luantai) and gave him the designation of Tong Fengge Luantai Pingzhangshi (同鳳閣鸞臺平章事), making him a chancellor de facto.

On the edict giving him these offices, she emphasized that he was more impressive than even Lord Guangcheng (廣成子) of Yellow Emperor's time who claimed to have lived for 1,200 years, and Duke Heshang (河上公) of Emperor Wen of Han's time who claimed to have written commentaries for the Tao Te Ching for more than 1,700 years. Less than a month later, Wei requested that he be allowed to return to Mount Song. Wu Zetian relieved him of his posts and escorted him back to Mount Song.

== Change in attitude ==
In 695, however, Wu Zetian's attitude to these individuals changed, in light of a fire that Huaiyi set to the imperial meeting hall (明堂, Mingtang) in jealousy over her having a new lover, the imperial physician Shen Nanqiu (沈南璆). Slightly earlier, Wei had claimed that he would be capable of creating medicine that would allow people to live forever, and Wu Zetian sent him to take governmental wagons to the Lingnan region to look for material for the medicine.

After the fire, the old nun—who was said to pretend to follow Buddhist teachings on vegetarianism but instead was secretly feasting on pigs and goats, and who had also kept a staff of 100 young and immoral nuns as her disciples—went to see Wu Zetian. Wu Zetian rebuked her and said, "You claimed that you could predict the future, so why could you not predict the fire?" Wu Zetian had the nun escorted back to Henei, and her disciples and the old non-Han man both fled.

== Immorality reports ==
Subsequent to their flight, there were reports of immorality on their part, and Wu Zetian, in order to trap them, summoned the old nun back to Linzhi Temple. Her disciples returned, and Wu Zetian had the eunuch in charge of palace security make a surprise trip to Linzhi Temple, arresting all of the young nuns and making them government servants. Meanwhile, Wei was returning from his trip to Lingnan, and had reached Yanshi (偃師, near Luoyang) when he heard what had happened, and he committed suicide by hanging.
