= Wei Juyuan =

Tang dynasty official (631-710)

Wei Juyuan (Chinese: 韋巨源; 631 – July 22, 710), posthumous name Duke Zhao of Shu (舒昭公), was an official of the Tang and Wu Zhou dynasties of China, serving multiple times as chancellor during the reigns of Wu Zetian, her son Emperor Zhongzong, and her grandson Emperor Shang. During Emperor Zhongzong's reign, he became aligned with Emperor Zhongzong's powerful wife Empress Wei, and after Emperor Zhongzong's death in 710 and a coup led by Emperor Zhongzong's sister Princess Taiping and Emperor Zhongzong's nephew Li Longji the Prince of Linzi killed Empress Wei, Wei Juyuan was also killed.

== Background ==
Wei Juyuan was born in 631, during the reign of Emperor Taizong. He was a fourth-generation descendant of the Western Wei and Northern Zhou general Wei Xiaokuan, and his grandfather Wei Kuangbo (韋匡伯), who was a duke during the Tang dynasty's predecessor and Northern Zhou's successor, the Sui dynasty, based on Wei Xiaokuan's achievements. Wei Juyuan's father Wei Siren (韋思仁) was an imperial attendant during Tang.

== During Wu Zetian's reign ==
Wei Juyuan himself had become deputy minister of vassal affairs (司賓少卿) during the reign of Emperor Taizong's daughter-in-law (and one-time concubine) Wu Zetian. As of 693, he was serving as Wenchang Zuo Cheng (文昌左丞), one of the secretaries general of the executive bureau of government (文昌臺, Wenchang Tai), when Wu Zetian gave him the designation Tong Fengge Luantai Pingzhangshi (同鳳閣鸞臺平章事), making him a chancellor de facto. In 694, he was made the assistant minister of defense (夏官侍郎, Xiaguan Shilang) and still chancellor with the Tong Fengge Luantai Pingzhangshi designation. He was said to be meticulous in matters of reviewing subordinates' actions and correcting them that his subordinates complained, but he was able to correct a number of problems that they were having.

In late 694, Wu Zetian, displeased with the powerful chancellor Li Zhaode, exiled Li, and fellow chancellor Zhou Yunyuan and the assistant chief judge of the supreme court, Huangfu Wenbei (皇甫文備), then submitted articles of impeachment against Wei and several fellow chancellors -- Doulu Qinwang, Du Jingjian, Su Weidao, and Lu Yuanfang—for not being able to curb Li Zhaode's power. The five chancellors so accused were all demoted to be prefectural prefect—in Wei's case, to be the prefect of Fu Prefecture (鄜州, roughly modern Yan'an, Shaanxi). However, he was soon recalled to be the minister of treasury (地官尚書, Diguan Shangshu). By 700, he was again Wenchang Zuo Cheng, when he was made Nayan (納言), the head of the examination bureau (鳳閣, Fengge) and a post considered one for a chancellor. In 701, he was removed from that post, as his clansman Wei Anshi was becoming a chancellor at the time, and Wu Zetian did not like having multiple members of the same clan serving together as chancellors. He was subsequently put in charge of the capital Luoyang when Wu Zetian visited the western capital Chang'an, apparently to oversee a construction project at her mother Lady Yang's tomb. While she was still at Chang'an, in 702, she summoned Wei Juyuan to Chang'an and had his deputy Li Jiao put in charge of Luoyang. Subsequently, when she returned to Luoyang, he was put in charge of Chang'an.

== During Emperor Zhongzong's reign ==
In 705, Wu Zetian was overthrown in a coup, and her son Li Xian, who had previously been briefly emperor in 684, was restored to the throne (as Emperor Zhongzong). Wei Juyuan was made the minister of public works (工部尚書, Gongbu Shangshu) and created the Viscount of Tong'an. In the fall of that year, Wei Juyuan was given the designation Tong Zhongshu Menxia Sanpin (同中書門下三品), again making him a chancellor de facto; he was also created the Count of Xun. However, he was soon made the minister of rites (禮部尚書, Libu Shangshu) and no longer chancellor, as Wei Anshi was still chancellor at the time.

In 706, Wei Juyuan was the minister of justice (刑部尚書, Xingbu Shangshu), when he was again given the Tong Zhongshu Menxia Sanpin designation—and further, Emperor Zhongzong had Wei Juyuan formally considered part of the clan of his wife Empress Wei. He was created the Duke of Shu. He thereafter appeared to become part of Empress Wei's faction at court. When Emperor Zhongzong's son-in-law Wang Tongjiao (王同皎) was accused of a treasonous plot with Zhang Zhongzhi (張仲之), Zu Yanqing (祖延慶), and Zhou Jing (周璟), in 706, of plotting to kill Empress Wei's lover Wu Sansi the Prince of Dejing (Wu Zetian's nephew) and then depose her, Zhang, while being interrogated, openly accused Empress Wei and Wu Sansi of adultery. Wei Juyuan and another chancellor aligned with Empress Wei, Yang Zaisi, who were conducting the interrogation, were said to have simply ignored the accusations as if they did not hear them.

In 707, Wei Juyuan was again the head of the examination bureau (now renamed Menxia Sheng (門下省)), now with the title Shizhong (侍中). In spring 708, when there were rumors coming out of the palace that there was a five-colored cloud—a sign of holiness—that was coming out of Empress Wei's skirt, Wei advocated that this incident be publicized, and Emperor Zhongzong agreed.

In 709, Wei Juyuan and Yang were both was made Pushe (僕射), heads of the executive bureau (now renamed Shangshu Sheng (尚書省)), and they both continued to serve as chancellor with the Tong Zhongshu Menxia Sanpin designation. Later that year, when Emperor Zhongzong was set to make sacrifices to heaven to the south of Chang'an (now capital again), Zhu Qinming the principal of the imperial university and Zhu's deputy Guo Shanyun (郭山惲), in order to flatter Empress Wei, suggested that she be allowed to serve as the second-stage sacrificer after Emperor Zhongzong, against the opposition of several other scholars, Tang Shao (唐紹), Jiang Qinxu (蔣欽緒), and Chu Wuliang (褚無量). Wei Juyuan ruled that Zhu's proposal be accepted, and so Empress Wei served as the second sacrificer. Zhu initially proposed that Emperor Zhongzong's powerful daughter Li Guo'er the Princess Anle be made the third sacrificer, but Tang and Jiang sternly opposed it, and so Emperor Zhongzong had Wei Juyuan serve as the third sacrificer.

In spring 710, there was an occasion when Emperor Zhongzong had the high level officials play games of cuju and tug of war. It was said that Wei Juyuan and fellow chancellor Tang Xiujing, due to their old age, fell and could not get up, drawing much laughs from the imperial household.

== During Emperor Shang's reign ==
In summer 710, Emperor Zhongzong suddenly died—a death that traditional historians believe to be a poisoning by Empress Wei and Li Guo'er, so that Empress Wei could eventually become emperor like Wu Zetian and Li Guo'er could be crown princess. Empress Wei made Emperor Zhongzong's son, by a concubine, Li Chongmao the Prince of Wen emperor (as Emperor Shang), but retained actual power as empress dowager and regent. Less than month later, Emperor Zhongzong's sister Princess Taiping and nephew Li Longji the Prince of Linzi led a coup that killed Empress Dowager Wei and Li Guo'er. When the news of the coup broke, Wei Juyuan's family members advised him to hide due to his connections with Empress Dowager Wei. Wei Juyuan responded, "I am an important official. How can I stay away when the government is suffering such disaster?" He set out to go to the imperial government buildings, but on the way was intercepted by the troops participating in the coup, and he was killed.

Soon thereafter, Li Longji's father Li Dan the Prince of Xiang, himself a former emperor, displaced Emperor Shang and retook the throne (as Emperor Ruizong). He awarded Wei Juyuan posthumous honors, and initially the imperial scholar Li Chuzhi (李處直) proposed that Wei Juyuan be given the posthumous name Zhao (昭, "accomplished"). Another official, Li Yong (李邕), vehemently opposed, stating:

Wu Sansi recommended him to be chancellor, and the Wei woman [(i.e., Empress Wei)] made him a member of her clan. He was created titles without accomplishments and received salaries without virtues. Despite the fact that he was of the same clan as Wei Anshi, he defamed Wei Anshi, and instead associated with Zong Chuke [(a chancellor also aligned with Empress Wei)] of a different clan. The posthumous name of "Zhao" is inappropriate.

Li Yong later submitted a lengthy written opposition to the "Zhao" posthumous name, which popular opinion agreed was good argument, but Emperor Ruizong still bestowed the posthumous name of Zhao.

== Notes and references ==
- Old Book of Tang, vol. 92.
- New Book of Tang, vol. 123.
- Zizhi Tongjian, vols. 205, 206, 207, 208, 209.
