= Du Jingjian =

Chinese chancellor

Du Jingjian (Chinese: 杜景儉) was an official of the Chinese Tang and Wu Zhou dynasties, twice serving as chancellor during Wu Zetian's reign.

It is not known when Du was born, but it is known that his family was from Ji Prefecture (冀州, roughly modern Hengshui, Hebei). He passed the imperial examination when he was young and eventually became an assistant imperial censor. At a later point, he was made a secretary in charge of military matters at Yi Prefecture (益州, roughly modern Chengdu). At that time, Fang Siye (房嗣業), the military advisor to the prefect of nearby Long Prefecture (隆州, roughly modern Nanchong, Sichuan) had just received an order of promotion to be the military advisor to the prefect of Yi Prefecture (considered a promotion since Yi Prefecture was larger and more important) and had arrived at Yi Prefecture. However, paperwork of Fang's commission had not yet arrived at Yi Prefecture, yet he wanted to take his post immediately. He was also beginning to subject the military staff, whom he commanded, to physical punishments. Du, who was under his command, responded, "Although you, Lord, have been ordered to be this prefecture's military advisor, the prefectural government has not yet received orders of your commission. Why do you care about your salary for a few days and not want to wait for the imperial edict. Is it not that you are in too much of a hurry to be in command?" Fang became angry, but Du then continued:

You, Lord, are holding an order that is not an imperial edict. It has not yet been verified, and yet you want to be in control of the prefecture. Who can vouch for you? The disaster at Yang Prefecture [(揚州, roughly modern Yangzhou, Jiangsu)] happened in this manner as well.

Du then dismissed the staff from Fang's presence, and Fang, humiliated, stopped giving orders. Several days later, the imperial edict arrived, but instead of making Fang the military advisor for Yi Prefecture, made him the military advisor of Jing Prefecture (荊州, roughly modern Jingzhou, Hubei). The officials at Yi Prefecture made up a rhyme, "The secretary's argument had a connection to heaven; the military advisor of Yi Prefecture lost his thunder." (錄事意, 與天通, 益州司馬折威風, Lushi yi, yu tian tong, Yizhou sima zhe weifeng.)

Du became famed for this incident. He was eventually made the secretary general at the ministry of vassal affairs (司賓主簿, Sibin Zhubu), and then the secretary general at the supreme court (司刑丞, Sixing Cheng). During Wu Zetian's Tianshou era (690-691), he was serving with such individuals as Xu Yougong (徐有功), Lai Junchen, and Hou Sizhi. He and Xu were known for lenience, while Lai and Hou were known for torturing prisoners and getting them to confess to nonexistent crimes. There was a saying at the time, "Meet Xu or Du and live; meet Lai or Hou and die." Eventually, he was made the military advisor to the prefect of the capital prefecture Luo Prefecture (洛州, roughly modern Luoyang, Henan).

In 694, Wu Zetian made Du Fengge Shilang (鳳閣侍郎), the deputy head of the legislative bureau of government (鳳閣, Fengge), and gave him the designation Tong Fengge Luantai Pingzhangshi (同鳳閣鸞臺平章事), making him a chancellor de facto. On an occasion, Wu Zetian, who favored signs of fortune, showed a pear flower in the winter. All of the other chancellors thought it was a sign of fortune that the pear was flowering in the winter, but Du did not, instead pointing out that this showed that the seasons were not in order, and begged for forgiveness—stating that this must be a sign that the officials were not doing their jobs properly. Wu Zetian, in approval, responded, "Only you are a true chancellor." However, later in 694, Wu Zetian, displeased with the powerful chancellor Li Zhaode, exiled Li, and fellow chancellor Zhou Yunyuan and the assistant chief judge of the supreme court, Huangfu Wenbei (皇甫文備), then submitted articles of impeachment against Du and several fellow chancellors -- Doulu Qinwang, Wei Juyuan, Su Weidao, and Lu Yuanfang—for not being able to curb Li Zhaode's power. The five chancellors so accused were all demoted to be prefectural prefect—in Du's case, to be the prefect of Zhen Prefecture (榛州, in modern Chongqing).

Eventually, Du was recalled to the capital to serve as the chief judge of the supreme court (司刑卿, Sixing Qing). In 697, when, in the aftermath of a Khitan invasion led by Sun Wanrong, Wu Yizong (武懿宗) the Prince of Henan (the grandson of Wu Zetian's uncle Wu Shiyi (武士逸)) had proposed that the people who had previously surrendered to Khitan all be considered traitors and be executed. This was opposed by the official Wang Qiuli (王求禮) and Du, who pointed out that these people were forced into surrendering to save their lives. Wu Zetian agreed and spared them. Later that year, Du was again made Fengge Shilang and chancellor with the designation Tong Fengge Luantai PIngzhangshi. In 698, however, he was removed from his chancellor position and made the minister of justice (秋官尚書, Qiuguan Shangshu). While serving at that post, he was accused of revealing palace secrets and first made the deputy chief judge of the supreme court (司刑少卿, Sixing Shaoqing) and then the secretary general at Bing Prefecture (并州, roughly modern Taiyuan, Shanxi). He died on the way to Bing Prefecture.

== Notes and references ==
- Old Book of Tang, vol. 90.
- New Book of Tang, vol. 116.
- Zizhi Tongjian, vols. 204, 205, 206.
