= Wang Hongyi =

Wang Hongyi (Chinese: 王弘義) (died 694) was a secret police official during the Chinese dynasty Tang dynasty and Wu Zetian's Zhou dynasty.

It is not known when Wang Hongyi was born, but it is known that he was from Hengshui. He was known as a hoodlum in his youth, and on one occasion, when he begged for melons from a farmer but the farmer refused, he falsely reported to the county magistrate that there was a white rabbit—then considered a sign of good virtue for the emperor—in the melon field; the magistrate sent soldiers into the field to hunt try to find the white rabbit, and the melon field was destroyed. On another occasion, when he went through the region of Zhao (趙州, part of modern Shijiazhuang, Hebei) and Bei (貝州, roughly modern Xingtai, Hebei), he happened to see the country people putting on a vegetarian feast for Buddhist monks, and he falsely reported that they were plotting a rebellion. More than 200 people were killed.

As of 690, Wu Zetian, then empress dowager and regent over her son Emperor Ruizong, was poised to take the throne herself, and by that point, she had given Wang a general title, and then made him an assistant censor. On one occasion, when Wang Anren (王安仁) the commandant at Sheng Prefecture (勝州, in modern Hohhot, Inner Mongolia) was accused of treason, Empress Dowager Wu sent Wang Hongyi to investigate. Wang Anren put himself in stocks to try to show his loyalty, but Wang Hongyi was not persuaded, and had Wang Anren beheaded even as he was in the stocks; he also beheaded Wang Anren's son. As he was returning to the eastern capital Luoyang, he went through Fen Prefecture (汾州, roughly modern Lüliang, Shanxi), where the military advisor to the prefect, a man named Mao, held a feast for him. For reasons unknown, however, during the feast, he ordered Mao to leave the table and beheaded Mao. He put Mao's head on a spear and entered Luoyang with it, and everyone who saw the sight shivered. At that time, the prison for political prisoners were inside the Lijing Gate (麗景門), and as political prisoners entering that gate would thus rarely be able to leave alive, Wang jokingly referred to the Lijing Gate with two different characters, 例竟, also pronounced Lijing but meaning "the end."

In 692, Wang falsely implicated the chancellors Li Youdao, Wang Xuan, Yuan Zhihong, Cui Shenji, and Li Yuansu, and other officials Kong Siyuan (孔思元) and Ren Linghui (任令輝), and all of them were removed from their posts and exiled to the Lingnan region.

In 694, Wang was accused of corruption and exiled to Qiong Prefecture. He pretended to receive an edict from Wu Zetian recalling him to Luoyang, but as he reached the north bank of the Han River, he encountered the censor Hu Yuanli (胡元禮). Hu interrogated him and found out that he falsely claimed to be recalled by edict. Unable to defend himself, Wang pleaded with Hu, stating, "I am but similar to you, sir." Hu responded, "When you, sir, were a censor, I was the sheriff of Luoyang. I am now a censor and you are now a prisoner. Where is the similarity?" He had Wang caned to death. He had had brother Wang i have no idea killed.
