= Li Jiao (Tang dynasty) =

Chinese chancellor during the reigns of Wu Zetian

Li Jiao (Chinese: 李嶠), courtesy name Jushan (巨山), noble title Duke of Zhao (趙國公), was an official of the Tang and Wu Zhou dynasties of China, serving as chancellor during the reigns of Wu Zetian, her sons Emperor Zhongzong and Emperor Ruizong, and her grandson Emperor Shang.

== Background ==
It is not known exactly when Li Jiao was born, but it is known that his family was from Zhao Prefecture (趙州, roughly modern Shijiazhuang, Hebei). He came from a prominent clan, and his great-granduncle Li Yuancao (李元操) was a well-known official during Tang dynasty's predecessor Sui dynasty. His father Li Zhen'e (李鎮惡), who had served as the magistrate of Xiangcheng County (襄城, in modern Xuchang, Henan), died early, and it was said that Li Jiao served his mother Lady Zhang with great filial piety. His literary talent began to be known when he was young, and his reputation matched that of Su Weidao, who was also from Zhao Prefecture. He already understood the Five Classics at age 14 and was praised by the chancellor Xue Yuanchao. He passed the imperial examination at age 19 and was made the sheriff of Anding County (安定, in modern Dingxi, Gansu). He was soon promoted to serve in the capital Chang'an, and he, along with older colleagues Luo Binwang and Liu Guangye (劉光業), became known for their literary talent.

Sometime during the reign of Emperor Gaozong, Li Jiao became an imperial censor. At that time, there was a Lao (獠) rebellion in Yong (邕州, roughly modern Nanning, Guangxi) and Yan (巖州, roughly modern Laibin, Guangxi) Prefectures, and Emperor Gaozong launched an army to suppress it, with Li Jiao serving as the army's auditor. When the army reached Yong and Yan Prefectures, however, Li Jiao went to the rebel camps and persuaded the leaders to surrender, allowing the army to withdraw without a fight. He was later made imperial attendant (給事中, Jishizhong).

== During Wu Zetian's reign ==
By 692, Emperor Gaozong's wife Wu Zetian was reigning as "emperor" of her new Zhou dynasty, interrupting Tang dynasty. That year, her secret police official Lai Junchen had falsely accused the chancellors Ren Zhigu, Di Renjie, and Pei Xingben, along with other officials Cui Xuanli (崔宣禮), Lu Xian (盧獻), Wei Yuanzhong, and Li Sizhen (李嗣真) of treason. As these officials were set for execution, Wu Zetian had Li Jiao, along with two other officials, Zhang Deyu (張德裕) and Liu Xian (劉憲), review the cases. Zhang and Liu knew that the accusations were false, but feared Lai, and therefore initially failed to object to the judgments. Li Jiao advocated that they did, and so the three filed written objections. As a result, they offended Wu Zetian, and she demoted him to be the military advisor to the prefect of Run Prefecture (潤州, roughly modern Zhenjiang, Jiangsu). (The officials, however, were still spared after Di was able to secretly deliver a petition proclaiming his innocence to Wu Zetian.) After some time, Li Jiao was recalled to serve as Fengge Sheren (鳳閣舍人), a mid-level official at the legislative bureau of government (鳳閣, Fengge), and he became largely responsible for drafting imperial edicts. While serving in that office, in 697, when Eastern Tujue's khan Ashina Mochuo made a request for Zhou to return Tujue people who had previously submitted to Tang and also to grant a number of supplies that he needed, Li Jiao lodged an objection against the recommendation of the chancellors Yao Shu and Yang Zaisi to comply, but Wu Zetian still granted Ashina Mochuo's requests. Later that year, he took over the selection of officials at the ministry of civil service affairs (春官部, Chunguan Bu) on an acting basis, and he began establishing a list of reserve officials who would draw salaries from the imperial treasury. Also around that time, Wu Zetian had established an imperial censorate to review local government affairs (右御史臺), which would send out censors to examine the local government affairs, leaving the capital Luoyang in the third month of the lunar year and returning in the 11th month to report on findings. Li Jiao, believing that the time was insufficient, suggested dividing the empire into 20 circuits so that the censors had smaller areas to review. Wu Zetian initially agreed, but after opposition by other officials, did not carry out Li Jiao's proposal.

As of 698, Li Jiao was serving as Mishu Shaojian (秘書少監), the deputy head of the Palace Library, when he was given the designation Tong Fengge Luantai Pingzhangshi (同鳳閣鸞臺平章事), making him a chancellor de facto. In 700, Wu Zetian, in order to give her lovers Zhang Yizhi and Zhang Changzong legitimacy in their entries into the palace, had Li Jiao head a project to create a work known as the Essence of Pearls from the Three Religions (三教珠英, Sanjiao Zhuying) – a compilation of various poetry about Confucianism, Buddhism, and Taoism – and had Zhang Yizhi and Zhang Changzong involved in the project as well. Later that year, after Wu Zetian named Li Jiao's uncle Zhang Xi as a chancellor, Li Jiao, who was by this point serving also as Luantai Shilang (鸞臺侍郎), the deputy head of the examination bureau (鸞臺, Luantai), had his chancellor designation removed, because Wu Zetian did not want uncle and nephew to serve as chancellors at the same time. Li Jiao was instead made Chengjun Jijiu (成均祭酒), the principal of the imperial university.

By 702, Li Jiao was serving as deputy to the chancellor Wei Juyuan, who was serving as official in charge of Luoyang while Wu Zetian was at the western capital Chang'an, when Wu Zetian summoned Wei to Chang'an and had Li Jiao take over the responsibility at Luoyang.

By 703, when Wu Zetian changed the name of the executive bureau from Wenchang Tai (文昌臺) to Zhongtai (中臺), Li Jiao was serving as Zhongtai Zuo Cheng (中臺左丞), when he was made acting Nayan (納言), the head of the examination bureau and a post considered one for a chancellor. In 704, in response to the problem that imperial officials were not willing to be local officials, Li Jiao and fellow chancellor Tang Xiujing suggested that the officials at the central government be assigned to the prefectures and counties to serve as officials, offering to go first themselves. Wu Zetian had 20 officials randomly drawn, and neither Li Jiao nor Tang was sent out. Later in 704, Li Jiao was made acting Neishi (內史), the head of the legislative bureau and also a post considered one for a chancellor. Also in 704, when Wu Zetian instituted a tax on the Buddhist monks and nuns of the realm to build a large Buddha statute, Li Jiao and Zhang Tinggui (張廷珪) opposed the project, and Wu Zetian eventually stopped it. Li Jiao then requested to be relieved of Neishi duties, and was given the chancellor designation Tong Fengge Luantai Sanpin (同鳳閣鸞臺三品). Late in the year, he was removed of chancellor duties altogether, becoming minister of the treasury (地官尚書, Diguan Shangshu) instead.

== During Emperor Zhongzong's second reign ==
In 705, Wu Zetian was overthrown in a coup, in which Zhang Yizhi and Zhang Changzong were killed. Wu Zetian's son Li Xian the Crown Prince, formerly emperor, was restored to the throne (as Emperor Zhongzong). Li Jiao was accused of having flattered Zhang Yizhi and Zhang Changzong and was demoted out of the capital, to serve as the prefect of Yu Prefecture (豫州, roughly modern Zhumadian, Henan), but before he departed for Yu Prefecture was made the prefect of Tong Prefecture (通州, in modern Beijing). Several months later, he was recalled to serve as deputy minister of civil service affairs (吏部侍郎, Libu Shilang), and was soon promoted to be the minister of civil service affairs (吏部尚書, Libu Shangshu). It was said that when he was minister of civil service affairs, he, hoping to become chancellor again, expanded the roll of reserve officials and made many relatives and friends of powerful individuals reserve officials, in order to placate them.

In 706, Li Jiao was given the designation Tong Zhongshu Menxia Sanpin (同中書門下三品), making him again a chancellor. That year, when Emperor Zhongzong's son-in-law Wang Tongjiao (王同皎) was accused of a treasonous plot with Zhang Zhongzhi (張仲之), Zu Yanqing (祖延慶), and Zhou Jing (周璟), of plotting to kill Wu Sansi the Prince of Dejing (Wu Zetian's nephew), the lover of Emperor Zhongzong's powerful wife Empress Wei and then depose Empress Wei, Zhang, while being interrogated, openly accused Empress Wei and Wu Sansi of adultery. Li Jiao, Wei Juyuan, and Yang Zaisi were assigned to the investigation, in addition the censors Li Chengjia (李承嘉) and Yao Shaozhi (姚紹之). Wei and Yang acted as if they did not hear Zhang's accusation, while Li Jiao and Yao simply tried to have Zhang taken to prison for execution without acting on his accusation. Eventually, Wang and his associates were executed. Later that year, Li Jiao was again made the head of the legislative bureau, now with the title Zhongshu Ling (中書令). By this point, however, he had realized that his expansion of the roll of reserve officials was causing a major drain on the imperial treasury, and he, admitting this, offered to resign, an offer that Emperor Zhongzong declined.

In 707, Emperor Zhongzong's crown prince Li Chongjun, born of a concubine, was angry that Empress Wei's daughter Li Guo'er the Princess Anle was repeatedly insulting him and trying to become crown princess to displace him, started a rebellion and killed Wu Sansi and Wu Sansi's son Wu Chongxun (武崇訓, also Li Guo'er's husband). He subsequently marched on the palace, hoping to arrest Li Guo'er, Empress Wei, and Emperor Zhongzong's concubine Consort Shangguan Wan'er. Li Jiao was one of the officials who commanded imperial guards in countering Li Chongjun's attack, and Li Chongjun was eventually defeated and killed. Thereafter, Wei Yuanzhong, by this point a senior chancellor, was accused of association with Li Chongjun by Zong Chuke and Ji Chuna, and Li Jiao and Yang went along with Zong's and Ji's accusations; Wei was eventually exiled and died in exile.

In 708, when Emperor Zhongzong established an imperial literary institute Xiuwen Pavilion (修文館), Li Jiao was made a scholar at the institute, and Emperor Zhongzong often summoned the scholars for literary contests to be judged by Consort Shangguan. Also in 708, he was made minister of defense (兵部尚書, Bingbu Shangshu) and remained chancellor with the Tong Zhongshu Menxia Sanpin. He was also created the Duke of Zhao and given the honorific title Tejin (特進).

== During Emperor Shang's reign ==
In 710, Emperor Zhongzong died suddenly—a death that traditional historians believed to be a poisoning carried out by Empress Wei and Li Guo'er, so that Empress Wei could become emperor like Wu Zetian and Li Guo'er could become crown princess. For the time, however, Emperor Zhongzong's son Li Chongmao the Prince of Wei, also by a concubine, was made emperor (as Emperor Shang). Empress Wei retained power as empress dowager and regent, and she, while consolidating her power, were apprehensive about Emperor Zhongzong's brother Li Dan the Prince of Xiang, himself a former emperor, and his sister Princess Taiping. Li Jiao made a secret proposal to her to have Li Dan's sons sent out of the capital to be prefectural officials—a proposal that Empress Dowager Wei either did not accept or had no chance to implement. Less than a month later, a coup led by Princess Taiping and Li Dan's son Li Longji the Prince of Linzi killed Empress Wei and Li Guo'er. Emperor Shang was deposed, and Li Dan was restored to the throne (as Emperor Ruizong).

== During Emperor Ruizong's second reign ==
Li Jiao initially remained chancellor after Emperor Ruizong's return to the throne, but about a month later was demoted to be the prefect of Huai Prefecture (懷州, roughly modern Jiaozuo, Henan). He soon retired. In 713, Emperor Ruizong found out that Li Jiao had submitted the secret suggestion to Empress Dowager Wei to exile Emperor Ruizong's sons. Some of the officials that Emperor Ruizong told this to suggested that Li Jiao be executed, but the chancellor Zhang Shuo pointed out that Li Jiao's suggestion was a faithful one, as far as Empress Dowager Wei was concerned. Emperor Ruizong agreed, and while he issued an edict rebuking Li Jiao, he did not kill Li Jiao, although he made Li Jiao's son Li Changzhi (李暢之) the prefect of Qian Prefecture (虔州, roughly modern Ganzhou, Jiangxi) and had Li Jiao go with Li Changzhi to Qian Prefecture, effectively exiling him. At a later point, Li Jiao was made an advisor to the prefect of Lu Prefecture (廬州, roughly modern Hefei, Anhui), where he died at age 69.

== See also ==
- Collection of Precious Glories (Zhuying ji)

== Notes and references ==
- Old Book of Tang, vol. 94.
- New Book of Tang, vol. 123.
- Zizhi Tongjian, vols. 206, 207, 208, 209, 210.
