= Doulu Qinwang =

- Born: 624
- Died: 27 December 709 (aged 85)
Posthumous name
- Duke Yuan of Rui (芮元公)
- Father: Doulu Renye (豆盧仁業)

Doulu Qinwang (Chinese: 豆盧欽望; 630? – December 27, 709), né Lu Qinwang (盧欽望), alternatively named Doulu Wangzhi (豆盧望之), courtesy name Siqi (思齊), posthumous name Duke Yuan of Rui (芮元公), was a Chinese official of the Tang dynasty and the Wu Zhou dynasty, serving several terms as chancellor during the reigns of Wu Zetian and her son Emperor Zhongzong.

== Background ==
Doulu Qinwang might have been born in 630, and it is known that his family was from the Tang dynasty capital Chang'an. His family traced its ancestry to Murong Yun (慕容運), a younger brother of Former Yan's founder Murong Huang (Prince Wenming), and after Murong Yun's descendants became subjects of Northern Wei, they were known as the family that surrendered in righteousness—a concept that, in the Xianbei language, was called "Doulu," and therefore had their family name changed to Doulu. Doulu Qinwang's great-grandfather Doulu Tong (豆盧通) served as a provincial governor and carried the title of Duke of Nanchen during Tang's predecessor Sui dynasty, as he had married one of the sisters of Emperor Wen of Sui. His son and Doulu Qinwang's grandfather, Doulu Kuan (豆盧寬), was thus a nephew of Emperor Wen, and served as a county magistrate. When Tang's founder Emperor Gaozu rebelled against Sui rule in 617 and conquered the Guanzhong region (i.e., the region around Chang'an), Doulu Kuan surrendered, and Emperor Gaozu gave a daughter to Doulu Kuan's son (Doulu Qinwang's uncle) Doulu Huairang (豆盧懷讓) in marriage, and changed the family's name to Lu, pursuant to the edict that Emperor Xiaowen of Northern Wei had issued in 496 to have Xianbei names changed to Han names. Doulu Qinwang therefore would have been born with the family name of Lu. However, in 640, when Doulu Kuan died, Emperor Gaozu's grandson Emperor Gaozong changed the family's name back to Doulu. Doulu Qinwang's father Doulu Chengye (豆盧承葉) had a general title, but his acts are otherwise unrecorded in history.

== During Wu Zetian's reign ==
Doulu Qinwang had at one point served as the commandant at Yue Prefecture (越州, roughly modern Shaoxing, Zhejiang), and as of 693, during the reign of Emperor Gaozong's wife Wu Zetian, was serving as the minister of vassal affairs (司賓卿, Sibin Qing), when Wu Zetian promoted him to the post of Neishi (內史) – the head of the legislative bureau of government (鳳閣, Fengge) and a post considered one for a chancellor. In 694, there was an incident where Doulu, without informing the other officials what the contents of his petition was, ordered the other officials to sign a petition—which, without their knowledge, contained an offer for all officials to give up two months of salary in order to aid in the war effort against Eastern Tujue. When Doulu's subordinate Wang Qiuli (王求禮) objected, on the account that the low level officials would not be able to support themselves if they gave up two months of salary, Doulu refused to listen, and Wang directly reported it in person to Wu Zetian. Eventually, the matter of having the officials giving up two months of salary was not further mentioned.

In late 694, Wu Zetian, displeased with the powerful chancellor Li Zhaode, exiled Li, and fellow chancellor Zhou Yunyuan and the assistant chief judge of the supreme court, Huangfu Wenbei (皇甫文備), then submitted articles of impeachment against Doulu and several fellow chancellors – Wei Juyuan, Du Jingjian, Su Weidao, and Lu Yuanfang – for not being able to curb Li Zhaode's power. The five chancellors so accused were all demoted to be prefectural prefect—in Doulu's case, to be the prefect of Zhao Prefecture (趙州, roughly modern Shijiazhuang, Hebei).

In 695, Doulu was recalled to serve as the minister of ceremony (司禮卿, Sili Qing), and then was made the minister of justice (秋官尚書, Qiuguan Shilang) and created the Duke of Rui, a title that his grandfather Doulu Kuan had carried. He was subsequently commissioned to tour the prefectures north of the Yellow River. In 697, he was serving as the head of the household of Wu Zetian's son and crown prince Li Dan (formerly emperor), when she made him Wenchang You Xiang (文昌右相), one of the heads of the executive bureau (文昌臺, Wenchang Tai), and gave him the designation of Tong Fengge Luantai Sanpin (同鳳閣鸞臺三品), making him a chancellor de facto. In 698, however, he was removed from those posts and made an advisor to Li Dan. Later that year, after Li Dan yielded the position of crown prince to his brother Li Xian, also formerly an emperor, Doulu continued to serve as an advisor to Li Xian.

== During Emperor Zhongzong's second reign ==
In 705, Wu Zetian was overthrown in a coup, and Li Xian was restored to the throne (as Emperor Zhongzong). He made Doulu Qinwang a head of the executive bureau (now renamed Shangshu Sheng (尚書省)) again—now with the title changed to Puye (僕射). However, this created an ambiguity as to whether Doulu was a chancellor, as, while officials serving as Puye had, in the reigns of Emperor Gaozu and his son Emperor Taizong, been considered chancellors, during Emperor Gaozong's reign, he rarely had them serve without also the de facto chancellor designation Tong Zhongshu Menxia Sanpin (同中書門下三品) (later changed by Wu Zetian to Tong Fengge Luantai Sanpin), thus creating a question whether Puye without such designation were still chancellors. (The Puye during Emperor Gaozong's reign would therefore generally rule on exclusively executive bureau jurisdiction matters in the morning and rule on national matters in the afternoon.) Doulu's colleague as Puye, Tang Xiujing, carried the designation of Tong Zhongshu Menxia Sanpin, but Doulu did not, and he therefore did not dare to involve himself in national affairs discussions. Emperor Zhongzong had to clarify the situation by shortly issuing an edict clarifying that Doulu had the authority to serve as a chancellor. However, this edict also appeared to have the effect that, from this point on, heads of the executive bureau who did not carry de facto chancellor designations were no longer considered chancellors.

In 706, Doulu received the honorific title of Kaifu YItong Sansi (開府儀同三司) and assumed the additional responsibility as secretary general to Li Dan, then the Prince of Xiang. In 708, he requested retirement, but the request was rejected. He died later that year and was buried with honors near the tomb of Emperor Gaozong and Wu Zetian.

It was said that while serving as chancellor during Wu Zetian's and Emperor Zhongzong's reigns, Doulu was careful in his own behavior and did not dare to curb the powers of Wu Zetian's lovers Zhang Yizhi and Zhang Changzong, as well as Wu Zetian's nephew Wu Sansi the Prince of Dejing, who became exceedingly powerful in Emperor Zhongzong's reign due to his personal influence on Emperor Zhongzong and his affair with Emperor Zhongzong's powerful wife Empress Wei. Doulu was much criticized by popular opinion at the time.

== Sources ==
- Old Book of Tang, vol. 90.
- New Book of Tang, vol. 114.
- Zizhi Tongjian, vols. 205, 206, 208, 209.
