= Zhou Yunyuan =

Chinese chancellor (died 695)

Zhou Yunyuan (周允元) (died January 29, 695), courtesy name Ruliang (汝良), was an official of Wu Zetian's Zhou Dynasty, briefing serving as chancellor.

It is not known when Zhou Yunyuan was born, but it is known that he was from Yu Prefecture (豫州, roughly modern Zhumadian, Henan). He passed the imperial examination in his youth. He became deputy imperial censor reviewing central government affairs (左肅政中丞, Zuo Suzheng Zhongcheng) in early 694, and in winter 694 Wu Zetian made him acting Fengge Shilang (鳳閣侍郎), the deputy head of the legislative bureau of government (鳳閣, Fengge). She also gave him the designation of Tong Fengge Luantai Pingzhangshi (同鳳閣鸞臺平章事), making him a chancellor de facto. Soon thereafter, Zhou and the assistant chief judge of the supreme court Huangfu Wenbei (皇甫文備) submitted articles of impeachment against five chancellors -- Doulu Qinwang, Wei Juyuan, Du Jingjian, Su Weidao, and Lu Yuanfang, of being unable to curb the powerful chancellor Li Zhaode, whom Wu Zetian exiled in late 694. The five chancellors accused were demoted to be prefectural prefects.

On one occasion, when Wu Zetian held a feast for the chancellors, she asked them to quote good passages from books. The passage that Zhou selected was, "Be ashamed that your emperor is not as good as Emperor Yao and Emperor Shun." (Emperors Yao and Shun were mythical emperors said to be very benevolent.) Wu Zetian's nephew Wu Sansi believed that these words were hurtful and tried to rebuke Zhou, but Wu Zetian said, "These words are faithful and honest words. How can you treat them as wrong?"

Zhou died in 695. Wu Zetian personally wrote a poem to mourn him, considered a great honor at the time.

== Notes and references ==
- Old Book of Tang, vol. 90.
- New Book of Tang, vol. 114.
- Zizhi Tongjian, vol. 205.
