= Li Youdao =

Li Youdao (李游道) was an official of Wu Zetian's Zhou dynasty, briefly serving as chancellor.

Despite Li's high status, little is firmly established about his career except for the time that he served as chancellor—as, unusual for a chancellor, he did not have a biography in either the Old Book of Tang or the New Book of Tang. It is known that his clan was a prominent one, from what was one point Zhao Commandery (趙郡, roughly modern Shijiazhuang, Hebei), that traced its ancestry all the way back to the great Warring States period Zhao general Li Mu. Li Youdao's ancestors later served as officials through the Qin dynasty, Han dynasty, Cao Wei, Jin dynasty (266–420), Former Yan and/or Later Yan, Northern Wei, Northern Qi, Sui dynasty, and the Tang dynasty. His father Li Shushen (李叔慎) served as a deputy minister during Tang.

As of 692, Li Youdao was serving as the chief judge of the supreme court (司刑卿, Sixing Qing) and the acting prefect of Shan Prefecture (陝州, roughly modern Sanmenxia, Henan), when Wu Zetian made him the minister of public works (冬官尚書, Dongguan Shangshu). She also gave him the designation Tong Fengge Luantai Pingzhangshi (同鳳閣鸞臺平章事), making him a chancellor de facto. Eight months later, however, he, along with other chancellors Wang Xuan, Yuan Zhihong, Cui Shenji, Li Yuansu, and other officials Kong Siyuan (孔思元), and Ren Linghui (任令輝), were falsely accused of crimes by Wu Zetian's secret police official Wang Hongyi. They were relieved from their posts and exiled to the Lingnan region. That was the last historical reference to Li Youdao, and it is not known when he died, although it is known that his son Li Jingxuan (李景宣) later served as a prefectural prefect.

== Notes and references ==
- Zizhi Tongjian, vol. 205.
