= Yuan Zhihong =

Yuan Zhihong (袁智弘) was an official of Wu Zetian's Zhou Dynasty, briefly serving as chancellor.

Despite Yuan high status, little is firmly established about his background or career except for the time that he served as chancellor—as, unusual for a chancellor, he did not have a biography in either the Old Book of Tang or the New Book of Tang. It is also known that his family was from Hedong (河東, in modern Yuncheng, Shanxi), but nothing else is known about his ancestors.

As of 692, Yuan was serving as the minister of justice (秋官尚書, Qiuguan Shangshu), when Wu Zetian gave him the designation Tong Fengge Luantai Pingzhangshi (同鳳閣鸞臺平章事), making him a chancellor de facto. Seven months later, however, he, along with other chancellors Li Youdao, Wang Xuan, Cui Shenji, Li Yuansu, and other officials Kong Siyuan (孔思元), and Ren Linghui (任令輝), were falsely accused of crimes by Wu Zetian's secret police official Wang Hongyi. They were relieved from their posts and exiled to the Lingnan region. That was the last historical reference to Yuan, and it is not known when he died, although it is known that his grandson Yuan Huan (袁澣) later served as a prefectural prefect.

== Notes and references ==
- Zizhi Tongjian, vol. 205.
