= Yao Shu =

Chinese politician of the Tang and Wu Zetian's Zhou Dynasty

Yao Shu (姚璹) (632 – 705), courtesy name Lingzhang (令璋), formally Count Cheng of Wuxing (吳興成伯), was a Chinese politician of the Tang and Wu Zetian's Zhou dynasty, and served twice as chancellor during Wu Zetian's reign.

He is not to be confused with Yao Shu (姚樞) (1203–1280), a Confucian adviser to Kublai Khan.

== Background ==
Yao Shu was born in 632, during the reign of Emperor Taizong. His grandfather was the historian Yao Silian, the lead author of the Book of Liang and Book of Chen, the official histories of Liang dynasty and Chen dynasty. His father Yao Chuping (姚處平) served as a military census officer and died early. Yao Shu raised his brothers and sisters and was said to be kind to them. He was also said to be well-studied and good at rhetoric.

== During Emperor Gaozong's reign ==
During the middle part of the Yonghui era of Emperor Taizong's son and successor Emperor Gaozong (650-656), Yao Shu passed the imperial examination and was made a secretary at the mansion of Emperor Gaozong's crown prince Li Hong. While serving there, he participated in a compilation work commissioned by Li Hong, the Yaoshan Yucai (瑤山玉彩), and after the work was completed, he was made Mishu Lang (秘書郎), a secretary at the Palace Library. During Emperor Gaozong's Tiaolu era (679-680), he was promoted to be Zhongshu Sheren (中書舍人), a mid-level official at the legislative bureau of government (中書省, Zhongshu Sheng) and created the Viscount of Wuxing.

== During Emperor Zhongzong's and Emperor Ruizong's first reigns ==
Emperor Gaozong died in 683 and was succeeded by his son Li Zhe the Crown Prince (as Emperor Zhongzong) (Li Hong's brother, as Li Hong had predeceased Emperor Gaozong), but actual power was in the hands of Emperor Gaozong's powerful wife Empress Wu (later known as Wu Zetian), as empress dowager and regent. In 684, when Emperor Zhongzong displayed signs of independence, she deposed him and replaced him with his brother Li Dan the Prince of Yu (as Emperor Ruizong), but thereafter wielded power even more firmly. Later that year, Li Jingye the Duke of YIng started a rebellion against her with the articulated goal of restoring Emperor Zhongzong, but the rebellion was quickly defeated. As Yao Shu's cousin Yao Jingjie (姚敬節) participated in Li Jingye's rebellion, Yao Shu was demoted to be the secretary general for the commandant at Gui Prefecture (桂州, roughly modern Guilin, Guangxi). Once Yao Shu got to Gui Prefecture, he, knowing that Empress Dowager Wu favored signs of good fortune, visited the mountains and forests of the area, and collected a number of items containing the character "Wu." He then submitted them as signs of fortune, and this pleased her greatly. She recalled him to serve as the deputy minister of civil service affairs (天官侍郎, Tianguan Shilang). He was said to be good at selecting people to serve as officials and was praised for this ability.

== During Wu Zetian's reign ==
In 690, Empress Dowager Wu had Emperor Ruizong yield the throne to her, and she took the throne as "emperor," establishing Zhou and interrupting Tang. In 692, she made Yao Shu Wenchang Zuo Cheng (文昌左丞), one of the secretaries general at the executive bureau (文昌臺, Wenchang Tai), and gave him the designation of Tong Fengge Luantai Pingzhangshi (同鳳閣鸞臺平章事), making him a chancellor de facto. At that time, the customs called for officials in charge of recording imperial history to record the acts of the emperors and chancellors, but as Wu Zetian's meetings with the chancellors rarely included those official historians, the meetings were not being recorded. Yao believed that given the importance of the meetings, they should be recorded, and therefore advocated that, by rotation, one of the chancellors be required to record the meetings. Wu Zetian agreed, and this became a custom thereafter followed. Later in 692, however, he was accused of improprieties not recorded in historical accounts, and he was made the minister of vassal affairs (司賓卿, Sibin Qing), no longer a chancellor.

In 694, Wu Zetian made Yao Shu Nayan (納言), the head of the examination bureau (鸞臺, Luantai) and a post considered one for a chancellor. Around that time, there was an incident where his fellow chancellor Doulu Qinwang, without informing the other officials what the contents of his petition was, ordered the other officials to sign a petition—which, without their knowledge, contained an offer for all officials to give up two months of salary in order to aid in the war effort against Eastern Tujue. When Doulu's subordinate Wang Qiuli (王求禮) objected, on the account that the low level officials would not be able to support themselves if they gave up two months of salary, and reported this objection in person to Wu Zetian, Yao initially tried to rebuke Wang, stating, "Wang Qiuli, you do not know what is important." Wang responded, "Do you, Yao Shu, really know what is important?" Thereafter, however, apparently by Wu Zetian's directive, the matter of having the officials give up two months of salary was no longer mentioned. Later that year, when Wu Zetian's nephew Wu Sansi proposed that a pillar made of copper and iron be built to commemorate Wu Zetian's reign and to deprecate Tang, Wu Zetian put Yao in charge of the project, and it was said that the project required so much metal that he ordered farmers to give up their farming equipment to be melted down for the material. After the completion of the pillar, Wu Zetian was set to give him a greater title, when he requested that instead posthumous honors be granted on his father Yao Chuping. Wu Zetian agreed, and posthumously honored Yao Chuping as a prefect.

In 695, Wu Zetian's lover Huaiyi, because she had another lover, Shen Nanqiu (沈南璆), was jealous, and set the imperial meeting hall (明堂, Ming Tang) on fire—an event that Wu Zetian hid the truth of and indicated was an accidental fire, but she considered stopping an imperial feast she was holding at the time to show humility in light of what might be divine disapproval. Yao opposed, however, stating:

In the past, when Xuanxie Hall [(宣榭殿, a palace of the first Zhou dynasty, destroyed by fire in 593 BC)] was burned, the Zhou dynasty nevertheless became stronger generation by generation. When Jiangzhang Palace [(建章宮, a palace Emperor Wu of Han built after Boliang Tower (柏梁臺) was destroyed by fire)] was built, the great imperial grace was extended far and wide. The imperial meeting hall is where imperial edicts are promulgated, and it is not the imperial ancestral temple. Your Imperial Majesty should not prostrate yourself.

Wu Zetian agreed, continued to feast, and further ordered that the meeting hall be rebuilt, with Yao in charge. After it was rebuilt, she gave him the honorific title Yinqing Guanglu Daifu (銀青光祿大夫).

In 696, the Umayyad Caliphate offered to give Wu Zetian a lion as a gift. Yao opposed accepting the gift, stating:

Lions are fierce animals that eat only meat. Transporting it from Suiye to the Divine Capital [(i.e., Luoyang)] requires transporting through regions where meat is difficult to find, and it will be very costly to do so. Your Imperial Majesty cares for the people and worries about hurting any animals. Because of this, you do not keep hunting eagles or dogs, and you have banned fishing and hunting. You stopped killing to show great grace, and you allowed living to show great virtue. Even all that fly and crawl thank you for your mercy. How can you be so exacting on yourself but yet so generous to a beast?

Wu Zetian agreed and declined the lion. Also at Yao's suggestion, she stopped a proposal to coat with gold nine ding that she had built as symbols of her governance. Later in 696, when Khitan's khan Li Jinzhong attacked, she commissioned Wu Sansi to serve as the commander of an army to defend against Khitan attacks and had Yao serve as Wu Sansi's assistant. During the campaign, Eastern Tujue's khan Ashina Mochuo indicated that he was willing to be aligned with Zhou against Khitan and made a number of requests for return of Tujue people who had surrendered to Zhou, various treasures, and food supplies, which, after Yao and fellow chancellor Yang Zaisi argued were necessary to maintain an alliance with Eastern Tujue, Wu Zetian agreed to give Ashina Mochuo, allowing him to become even stronger than before. After the end of the campaign against Khitan in 697, there was accusations against Yao, and she demoted him to be the secretary general at Yi Prefecture (益州, roughly modern Chengdu, Sichuan).

At the time that Yao went to Yi Prefecture, it was said that the low level officials of the region were largely corrupt and violent. Yao made thorough examinations and removed many of them. Wu Zetian appreciated his efforts and wrote him a letter to thank him, and further commented, "It is easy for a superior official to be clean himself, but it is difficult for him to make his subordinates clean. Yao Shu is able to do both."

Around that same time, however, there was an incident where Zhu Daipi (朱待辟), the secretary general of Xindu County (新都, in modern Chengdu), part of Yao's responsible area, was accused of corruption and sentenced to death. Zhu was friendly with a large number of Buddhist monks in the area, and it was said that Zhu secretly organized them to prepare to rebel, kill Yao, and occupy the region. This plot was reported to Yao, and Yao investigated and killed thousands of people. Wu Zetian further sent the secret police officials Song Yuanshuang (宋元爽) and Huo Xianke (霍獻可) to investigate, and several hundred more people were arrested and tortured. A large number of people were executed or exiled, and there was much mourning for the excessive killing. The imperial censor Yuan Shuji, believing that the investigations were improper, submitted articles of impeachment against Yao, and Wu Zetian initially ordered that Yuan and Yao debate with each other, but soon cancelled the debate. She promoted Yao to be the minister of treasury (地官尚書, Diguan Shangshu), and then instead made him the minister of public works (冬官尚書, Dongguan Shangshu). She also put him in charge of the western capital Chang'an. During the middle of her Chang'an era (701–705), he requested retirement, which she approved, and promoted his title to be that of a count.

== During Emperor Zhongzong's second reign ==
In 705, Wu Zetian was overthrown in a coup, and Emperor Zhongzong was restored. He made Yao Shu the minister of public works again, now with the restored Tang name of Gongbu Shangshu (工部尚書). Yao died later that year and, by his will, was buried without much ceremony.

== Notes and references ==
- Old Book of Tang, vol. 89.
- New Book of Tang, vol. 102.
- Zizhi Tongjian, vols. 205, 206.
