= Su Weidao =

Chinese official (c.648–c.705)

Su Weidao (Chinese: 蘇味道; 648?–705?), was an official of the Chinese Tang and Wu Zhou dynasties, twice serving as chancellor during Wu Zetian's reign.

== Background ==
Su Weidao might have been born in 648, at the end of the reign of Emperor Taizong. His family was from Zhao Prefecture (趙州, roughly modern Shijiazhuang, Hebei). In his youth, he was well known in the locale for his literary talent, along with Li Jiao, also from Zhao Prefecture. After he passed the imperial examination, he was made the sheriff of Xianyang County (咸陽, in modern Xianyang, Shaanxi). Pei Xingjian, then the deputy minister of civil service affairs, was impressed by his talent, and in 679, when Pei was set to command an army against Western Tujue's Shixing Khan Ashina Duzhi, who had just rebelled against the Tang dynasty, Pei invited Su to serve as his secretary. Around that time, the official Pei Judao had just been made a general commanding the imperial guards, and, after searching for a talented person to write a thanksgiving submission to then-reigning Emperor Gaozong (Emperor Taizong's son), found Su. The submission that Su wrote on Pei Judao's behalf was said to be well-written in an intricate manner, and he became famous.

== During Wu Zetian's reign ==
In 694, during the reign of Emperor Gaozong's wife Wu Zetian, Su Weidao was serving as Fengge Sheren (鳳閣舍人), a mid-level official at the legislative bureau of government (鳳閣, Fengge), when he was promoted to be the deputy head of the legislative bureau (鳳閣侍郎, Fengge Shilang) and given the designation Tong Fengge Luantai Pingzhangshi (同鳳閣鸞臺平章事), making him a chancellor de facto. Soon thereafter, when Wu Zetian's lover Huaiyi was commissioned to command an army against Eastern Tujue, Su and fellow chancellor Li Zhaode were commissioned to assist Huaiyi. In late 694, Wu Zetian, displeased with the power Li had, exiled Li, and fellow chancellor Zhou Yunyuan and the assistant chief judge of the supreme court, Huangfu Wenbei (皇甫文備), then submitted articles of impeachment against Su and several fellow chancellors – Doulu Qinwang, Wei Juyuan, Du Jingjian, and Lu Yuanfang—for not being able to curb Li Zhaode's power. The five chancellors so accused were all demoted to be prefectural prefect—in Su's case, to be the prefect of Ji Prefecture (集州, roughly modern Bazhong, Sichuan).

However, Su was soon recalled to be deputy minister of civil service affairs (天官侍郎, Tianguan Shilang). In 698, he was again made Fengge Shilang and chancellor with the designation Fengge Luantai Pingzhangshi. It was said that despite Su's abilities, he just tried to get by as a chancellor and rarely made key decisions. He had once stated, "It is not good to stand on principles or insist on things. It is better to be ambiguous." This caused him to be nicknamed "Ambiguous Su." However, he was praised for his loving relations with his brother Su Weixuan (蘇味玄), also an official. At times, Su Weixuan would make requests of him that he would deny, and Su Weixuan, displeased, would insult him, but he would take no offense from the insults.

In 701, both Su and fellow chancellor Zhang Xi were imprisoned—Zhang on accusations of corruption, while Su's alleged crimes were not specified in historical records. When Zhang reported to prison, he rode a horse to prison and acted normally. After he was placed within the special unit for high-level officials who were imprisoned, he continued to sleep on a regular bed and eat regular food. Su, on the other hand, walked to prison, slept on a thin mattress, and ate very simple foods. When Wu Zetian received reports, she pardoned Su and allowed him to resume his posts, while initially sentencing Zhang to death but then commuting the death penalty to exile.

In 704, Su requested a leave to go back to Zhao Prefecture to bury his father. Wu Zetian ordered the local government to supply his funeral needs, but Su used this opportunity to take over neighbors' lands and destroy their tombs. He further forced people into labor beyond what was permitted by Wu Zetian. The censor Xiao Zhizhong submitted an article of impeachment, and she demoted Su to be the prefect of Fang Prefecture (坊州, in modern Yan'an, Shaanxi). He was then made the secretary general at Yi Prefecture (益州, roughly modern Chengdu, Sichuan).

== During Emperor Zhongzong's second reign ==
Wu Zetian was overthrown in a coup 705, and her son Li Xian the Crown Prince, formerly emperor, was restored to the throne (as Emperor Zhongzong). During the coup, Wu Zetian's lovers Zhang Yizhi and Zhang Changzong were killed. Su was accused of flattering the Zhangs and demoted to be the prefect of Mei Prefecture (郿州, in modern Baoji, Shaanxi), but he was soon restored to his position as secretary general of Yi Prefecture. Before he could depart for Yi Prefecture, however, he died and was buried with honors.

== Notes and references ==
- Old Book of Tang, vol. 94.
- New Book of Tang, vol. 114.
- Zizhi Tongjian, vols. 203, 205, 206, 207.
