= Lu Yuanfang =

Chinese government official (639–701)

Lu Yuanfang (陸元方) (639 - March 20, 701), courtesy name Xizhong (希仲), was an official of Wu Zetian's Zhou Dynasty, twice serving as chancellor.

It is not known when Lu Yuanfang was born, but it is known that his family was from Su Prefecture (蘇州, roughly modern Suzhou, Jiangsu) and that he was from a line that had long served as officials during the Southern Dynasties. His grandfather or great-grandfather Lu Chen (陸琛) served as an important official during Chen Dynasty. His uncle Lu Jianzhi (陸柬之) was a well-known calligrapher and served as a Tang official, but his father Lu Xuanzhi (陸玄之) was only a county sheriff.

It was said that Lu Yuanfang initially passed one imperial examination out of eight—which was already enough for him to become an official—but he later passed all eight. He eventually became an assistant censor. On one occasion during Wu Zetian's reign, he was commissioned to go investigate cases in the Lingnan region, which at that time required travel by sea. Once the ship launched, there was violent sea movement, and the people in the ship were fearful. Lu stated, "I am setting out on a mission, not for my own profit; how will the gods hurt me?" He ordered the ship to continue, and soon, the storm passed. After he returned, he was promoted as a censor and then successively as Fengge Sheren (鳳閣舍人) -- a mid-level at the legislative bureau of government (鳳閣, Fengge) -- and deputy minister of justice (秋官侍郎, Qiuguan Shilang). While serving as deputy minister of justice, he was falsely accused by the secret police official Lai Junchen, but contrary to the fate of most officials accused by Lai, Wu Zetian took no actions against him, and in 693 made him Luantai Shilang (鸞臺侍郎) -- the deputy head of the examination bureau (鸞臺, Luantai) -- and gave him the designation Tong Fengge Luantai Pingzhangshi (同鳳閣鸞臺平章事), making him a chancellor de facto.

In late 694, Wu Zetian, displeased with the powerful chancellor Li Zhaode, exiled Li, and fellow chancellor Zhou Yunyuan and the assistant chief judge of the supreme court, Huangfu Wenbei (皇甫文備), then submitted articles of impeachment against Lu and several fellow chancellors -- Doulu Qinwang, Wei Juyuan, Du Jingjian, and Su Weidao—for not being able to curb Li Zhaode's power. The five chancellors so accused were all demoted to be prefectural prefect—in Lu's case, to be the prefect of Sui Prefecture (綏州, roughly modern Yulin, Shaanxi).

Later, Lu was recalled to be the deputy minister of civil service affairs (天官侍郎, Tianguan Shilang) and the minister of military supplies (司衛卿, Siwei Qing). On one occasion, he was accused of only selecting his friends to be officials, and Wu Zetian, in anger, formally removed him from his posts but let him continue to serve in acting capacity. Lu continued to recommend officials, and when Wu Zetian asked how he dared to do so, he responded, "Your subject only knows how to recommend people that he knows about; I do not care whether they are friend or foe." He further recommended his friend Cui Xuanwei, arguing that Cui had talent to be a chancellor. Wu Zetian by now was convinced that he was not personally biased. In 699, she again made him Luantai Shilang and chancellor with the Tong Fengge Luantai Pingzhangshi designation.

However, in 700, there was an occasion on which Wu Zetian was asking Lu about what was happening outside the palace, and Lu responded, "Your subject is a chancellor, and I will surely report all that is important. The trivial things that happens within the populace is not something I dare to report to Your Imperial Majesty." Wu Zetian was displeased, and she removed him as a chancellor, making him a staff member of her son and crown prince Li Xian (the later Emperor Zhongzong). Later, he was made Wengchang Zuo Cheng (文昌左丞), one of the secretaries general of the executive bureau (文昌臺, Wenchang Tai), before he died of illness.

It was said that Lu was honest and careful, and that in his second term as chancellor, whenever Wu Zetian was to commission an official, she would consult him first, but that he would never reveal the content of his recommendation. Before he died, he ordered that the drafts of all submissions that he made to Wu Zetian be brought to him and burned, stating, "My contributions to people are to remain hidden. Surely this will bring blessings to my descendants." He had a locked chest that he had never allowed people to open, and after his death, his family members opened it up, finding only a collection of imperial edicts inside. His sons Lu Xiangxian, Lu Jingqian (陸景倩), and Lu Jingrong (陸景融) all became key officials later, and Lu Xiangxian served as a chancellor during the reigns of Emperor Ruizong and Emperor Xuanzong.

== Notes and references ==
- Old Book of Tang, vol. 92.
- New Book of Tang, vol. 129.
- Zizhi Tongjian, vols. 205, 206.
