= Li Yuansu =

Li Yuansu (李元素) (died October 26, 696) was an official of Wu Zetian's Zhou dynasty, serving twice as chancellor.

Li Yuansu was the younger brother of Li Jingxuan, who served as chancellor during the reign of Wu Zetian's husband Emperor Gaozong of Tang. It was said that he, like Li Jingxuan, showed abilities as an official. He was, at one point, the magistrate of Wude County (武德, in modern Jiaozuo, Henan), when his superior, Li Wenjian (李文暕) the prefect of Huai Prefecture (roughly modern Jiaozuo) was set to collect gold and silver from the people to make barrels to offer to the emperor, and the people resented it. Other subordinates of Li Wenjian did not dare to speak about it, but Li Yuansu opposed it vehemently. Li Wenjian stopped collecting gold and silver from the people and, as he believed that Li Yuansu needed financial support, paid Li Yuansu out of his own pocket.

As of 692, during Wu Zetian's reign, Li Yuansu was acting deputy minister of treasury (地官侍郎, Diguan Shilang), when she promoted him to be Wenchang You Cheng (文昌右丞), one of the secretaries general of the executive bureau of government (文昌臺, Wenchang Tai) and gave him the designation Tong Fengge Luantai Pingzhangshi (同鳳閣鸞臺平章事), making him a chancellor de facto. Just slightly more than a month later, however, he, along with other chancellors Li Youdao, Wang Xuan, Yuan Zhihong, and Cui Shenji, and other officials Kong Siyuan (孔思元), and Ren Linghui (任令輝), were falsely accused of crimes by Wu Zetian's secret police official Wang Hongyi. They were relieved from their posts and exiled to the Lingnan region.

By 694, however, Li Yuansu had been recalled from exile and was serving as Wenchang You Cheng again, when he was made Fengge Shilang (鳳閣侍郎), the deputy head of the legislative bureau, and again given the de facto chancellor designation of Tong Fengge Luantai Pingzhangshi.

In late 696, there was a treasonous plot by the officials Liu Sili (劉思禮), Qilian Yao (綦連耀), and Wang Ju (王勮) — as the conspirators believed that Qilian was fated to be emperor one day. The official Ji Xu heard of the plot and relayed it to the secret police official Lai Junchen, who in turn reported it to Wu Zetian. Wu Zetian had Wu Yizong (武懿宗) the Prince of Henan (the grandson of her uncle Wu Shiyi (武士逸)) investigate, and Wu Yizong, promising Liu that he would be spared, had him implicate as many officials as he could, and Liu implicated some 36 officials, including Li Yuansu, fellow chancellor Sun Yuanheng, and other officials Shi Baozhong (石抱忠), Liu Qi (劉奇), Zhou Bo (周譒), and Wang Ju's brothers Wang Mian (王勔) and Wang Zhu (王助). All 36 households were slaughtered on the same day, and some 1,000 related persons were exiled. Not until Wu Zetian was overthrown in 705 were Li Yuansu's honors posthumously restored.

== Notes and references ==
- Old Book of Tang, vol. 81.
- New Book of Tang, vol. 106.
- Zizhi Tongjian, vols. 205, 206.
