= Yang Zhirou =

Yang Zhirou (楊執柔) (died 692?) was an official of Wu Zetian's Zhou dynasty, serving briefly as chancellor.

It is not known when Yang Zhirou was born. What is known is that his grandfather Yang Xu (楊續), a member of the Tang dynasty's predecessor Sui dynasty's imperial clan, was a brother of the early Tang chancellors Yang Gongren and Yang Shidao. As Wu Zetian's mother Lady Yang was a cousin of Yang Xu, she viewed him as a member of her mother's household and treated him well. As of 692, he was serving as the minister of defense (夏官尚書, Xiaguan Shangsu), when she gave him the designation of Tong Fengge Luantai Pingzhangshi (同鳳閣鸞臺平章事), making him a chancellor de facto. When doing so, she commented that she wanted the members of both her father's and mother's clans to be chancellors (and by that time, her nephews Wu Chengsi and Wu Youning were chancellors). Seven months later, as part of a major reorganization of her administration, he was removed from his chancellor position along with Wu Chengsi and Wu Youning, and made the minister of public works (地官尚書). He appeared to have died soon thereafter.

== Notes and references ==
- Old Book of Tang, vol. 62.
- New Book of Tang, vol. 100.
- Zizhi Tongjian, vol. 205.
