= Sun Yuanheng =

Sun Yuanheng (孫元亨) (died October 26, 696) was an official of Wu Zetian's Zhou Dynasty, serving briefly as chancellor.

Despite Sun's high status, little is firmly established about his career except for the time that he served as chancellor—as, unusual for a chancellor, he did not have a biography in either the Old Book of Tang or the New Book of Tang. He was not even listed in the table of the chancellors' family trees in the New Book of Tang for the Sun clan, and therefore, nothing is known about his family tree.

In spring 696, Sun was serving as the acting minister of defense (夏官尚書, Xiaguan Shangshu), when Wu Zetian gave him the designation Tong Fengge Luantai Pingzhangshi (同鳳閣鸞臺平章事), making him a chancellor de facto.

In late 696, there was a treasonous plot by the officials Liu Sili (劉思禮), Qilian Yao (綦連耀), and Wang Ju (王勮) -- as the conspirators believed that Qilian was fated to be emperor one day. The official Ji Xu heard of the plot and relayed it to the secret police official Lai Junchen, who in turn reported it to Wu Zetian. Wu Zetian had Wu Yizong (武懿宗) the Prince of Henan (the grandson of her uncle Wu Shiyi (武士逸)) investigate, and Wu Yizong, promising Liu that he would be spared, had him implicate as many officials as he could, and Liu implicated some 36 officials, including Sun, fellow chancellor Li Yuansu, and other officials Shi Baozhong (石抱忠), Liu Qi (劉奇), Zhou Bo (周譒), and Wang Ju's brothers Wang Mian (王勔) and Wang Zhu (王助). All 36 households were slaughtered on the same day, and some 1,000 related persons were exiled.

== Notes and references ==
- Zizhi Tongjian, vols. 205, 206.
