= Yang Zaisi =

Yang Zaisi (楊再思) (died 709), formally Duke Gong of Zheng (鄭恭公), was a Chinese politician in the Tang dynasty, serving several times as chancellor during the reigns of Wu Zetian and her son Emperor Zhongzong. Yang was criticized by traditional historians for his flattery.

== Background ==
It is not known when Yang Zaisi was born, but it is known that his family was from Zheng Prefecture (鄭州, roughly modern Zhengzhou, Henan). He passed the imperial examination when he was young and was made the sheriff of Xuanwu County (玄武, in modern Deyang, Sichuan). On one occasion, when he was in the capital Chang'an on official business and staying at an inn, there was a thief who stole his baggage. As the thief was leaving, Yang happened to encounter him, and the thief begged for forgiveness. He told the thief, "You, sir, must be committing this crime only out of poverty. Please go and not make a sound, as to not alert anyone else. Just leave me my official papers; the money you can have." The thief left, and Yang borrowed money for the remainder of his trip. He was eventually promoted to serve as a low-level official at the ministry of civil service affairs, and then as imperial censor.

== During Wu Zetian's reign ==
In 694, Yang Zaisi was still serving as censor when he was made Luantai Shilang (鸞臺侍郎), the deputy head of the examination bureau of government (鸞臺, Luantai), and was given the designation of Tong Fengge Luantai Pingzhangshi (同鳳閣鸞臺平章事), making him a chancellor de facto.

In 697, during a rebellion by Khitan's khan Sun Wanrong, Eastern Tujue's khan Ashina Mochuo, who had been at times ally and at times enemy of Wu Zetian's Zhou dynasty, indicated that he was willing to be aligned with Zhou against Khitan and made a number of requests for return of Tujue people who had surrendered to Zhou, various treasures, and food supplies, which, after Yang and fellow chancellor Yao Shu argued were necessary to maintain an alliance with Eastern Tujue, Wu Zetian agreed to give Ashina Mochuo, allowing him to become even stronger than before.

In 699, Yang was removed from his posts and made imperial censor reviewing central government affairs (左臺大夫, Zuotai Daifu), no longer chancellor.

In 704, troubled by the fact that prefectural prefects were not performing well, Wu Zetian asked the chancellors for suggestions. Li Jiao and Tang Xiujing suggested that this was the result of the tendency at the time for officials to consider central government duties, no matter how menial, to be more honored than local government duties. They further suggested that central government officials be rotated to the prefectures, offering to go first themselves. Wu Zetian ordered that central government officials be put into random drawings, and some 20 officials were drawn out. She allowed them to keep their central government posts but ordered that they also serve as acting prefects. Yang was one of the officials drawn, although it is not known which prefecture he was given. Later in 704, he was serving as the official in charge of then-capital Luoyang while Wu Zetian was at Chang'an, when he was made Neishi (內史), the head of the legislative bureau (鳳閣, Fengge) and a post considered one for a chancellor.

It was said that, during the years that Yang served as a chancellor under Wu Zetian, he was known for his flattery. Once, when at a feast held by the official Zhang Tongxiu (張同休), an older brother of Wu Zetian's lovers Zhang Yizhi and Zhang Changzong, Zhang Tongxiu joked with Yang that he looked like someone from Goguryeo. Yang, taking the joke in stride, immediately made a hat, put it on, and did a Goguryeo-style dance, causing the guests to laugh. At that time, there was someone who praised Yang Changzong's looks, stating, "Liulang [(Zhang Changzong's nickname)] has a face that looks like a lotus flower." Yang objected, and when Zhang Changzong asked why, he responded, "It is not that Liulang looks like lotus flower, but rather that the lotus flower looks like Liulang." Later in 704, when Zhang Tongxiu and two other brothers, Zhang Changqi (張昌期) and Zhang Changyi (張昌儀) were accused of corruption, Zhang Changzong was also investigated for corruption. The censors Li Chengjia (李承嘉) and Huan Yanfan proposed that Zhang Changzong be removed from office. Zhang Changzong objected, stating, "I have contributions to the state, and my crimes did not call for removal." Wu Zetian asked the chancellors, "Does Zhang Changzong have contributions?" Yang responded, "Zhang Changzong made medications that are good for Your Imperial Majesty. This is the greatest contribution possible." (Wu Zetian had used the guise that Zhang Changzong was making her medication as the rationale to let him have access to the palace." Wu Zetian was very pleased, and she pardoned Zhang Changzong. This, however, caused the people to view Yang as a flatterer, and a low-level official, Dai Lingyan (戴令言), wrote a satirical poem entitled, the Ode to the Two-Footed Fox (兩腳狐賦, Liangjiaohu Fu), satirizing Yang as a two-footed fox. When Yang saw the poem, he was incensed and demoted Dai. During his years serving under Wu Zetian, he also received progressively greater noble titles, from Baron of Hongnong eventually to Duke of Zheng.

== During Emperor Zhongzong's second reign ==
In 705, Wu Zetian was overthrown in a coup. Tang dynasty was restored, and her son Li Xian the Crown Prince, formerly emperor, was restored to the throne. A number of chancellors were removed from their posts as chancellors, but Yang was not; rather, he was made the minister of census (戶部尚書, Hubu Shangshu) with the de facto designation of Tong Zhongshu Menxia Sanpin (同中書門下三品) and made the official in charge of Chang'an. He was soon instead made the acting secretary general at Yang Prefecture (揚州, roughly modern Yangzhou, Jiangsu), but kept the chancellor designation and did not appear to actually report to Yang Prefecture. Later in 705, he was again made acting head of the legislative bureau (now named Zhongshu Sheng (中書省), with its head's title changed to Zhongshu Ling (中書令)) and still chancellor. Four months later, he was made Shizhong (侍中), the head of the examination bureau (now changed to Menxia Sheng (門下省)) and still chancellor. By this point, he appeared to be a part of the faction of Emperor Zhongzong's powerful wife Empress Wei.

In 706, when Emperor Zhongzong's son-in-law Wang Tongjiao (王同皎) was accused of a treasonous plot with Zhang Zhongzhi (張仲之), Zu Yanqing (祖延慶), and Zhou Jing (周璟), of plotting to kill Empress Wei's lover Wu Sansi the Prince of Dejing (Wu Zetian's nephew) and then depose her, Zhang, while being interrogated, openly accused Empress Wei and Wu Sansi of adultery. Yang and another chancellor aligned with Empress Wei, Wei Juyuan, who were conducting the interrogation, were said to have simply ignored the accusations as if they did not hear them.

In 707, Emperor Zhongzong's crown prince Li Chongjun, who was born of a concubine, angry at insults by Empress Wei's daughter Li Guo'er the Princess Anle and Li Guo'er's husband Wu Zhongxun (武崇訓, Wu Sansi's son) and attempts by Li Guo'er to be made crown princess to displace him, rose in rebellion and killed Wu Sansi and Wu Chongxun, and then approached the palace, intending to seize Empress Wei and Li Guo'er, as well as Emperor Zhongzong's concubine Consort Shangguan Wan'er, who was also Wu Sansi's lover. Yang was one of the high-level officials who commanded troops against Li Chongjun, who subsequently was defeated and killed. In the aftermath of the rebellion, the chancellors Zong Chuke and Ji Chuna, who wanted to implicate the senior chancellor Wei Yuanzhong (on account that Wei Yuanzhong's son Wei Sheng (魏升) had been forced into the rebellion), Yang supported Zong and Ji's efforts, and eventually, Wei Yuanzhong was exiled and died in exile. Later that year, Yang was again made Zhongshu Ling.

In spring 708, Yang was made You Pushe (右僕射), one of the heads of the executive bureau (尚書省, Shangshu Sheng), and still chancellor with the designation Tong Zhongshu Menxia Sanpin. He died summer of that year.
