= Cui Yuanzong =

Tang and Zhou Chinese official

Cui Yuanzong (崔元綜) was an official of the Chinese Tang dynasty and Wu Zetian's Zhou dynasty, serving as a chancellor during Wu Zetian's reign.

== Background ==
It is not known when Cui Yuanzong was born, but it is known that his family was from Zheng Prefecture (鄭州, roughly modern Zhengzhou, Henan), and that his clan had produced many officials throughout the Northern Wei, the Northern Zhou, and the Tang's predecessor, the Sui dynasty. His grandfather Cui Junsu (崔君肅) as a mid-level official under the Tang dynasty's founder Emperor Gaozu.

== During Wu Zetian's reign ==
As of Wu Zetian's Tianshou era (690–692), Cui Yuanzong was serving as the minister of justice (秋官尚書, Qiuguan Shangshu). In 692, Wu Zetian made him Luantai Shilang (鸞臺侍郎), the deputy head of the examination bureau of government (鸞臺, Luantai), and gave him the designation Tong Fengge Luantai Pingzhangshi (同鳳閣鸞臺平章事), making him a chancellor de facto. It was said that Cui was diligent while serving in office, and whenever he was on duty, he would stay late and take few breaks. He was also said to be careful in his actions and did not have any gourmet foods for over 20 years. However, he was also said to be, while appearing to be lenient on the outside, actually very harsh as a judge, and he picked faults with people and gave them heavy punishments, and therefore was feared. In 694, he was accused of crimes and exiled to Zhen Prefecture (振州, roughly modern Sanya, Hainan), and it was said that there was much rejoicing among other officials of his exile. At a later point, after a general pardon, he was recalled and served as imperial censor (監察御史, Jiancha Yushi).

== During Emperor Zhongzong's reign ==
Wu Zetian was overthrown in a coup in 705, and her son Li Xian, formerly emperor, was restored to the throne (as Emperor Zhongzong). During Emperor Zhongzong's reign, Cui successively served as Shangshu Zuo Cheng (尚書左丞) -- a secretary general of the executive bureau (尚書省, Shangshu Sheng), and as the prefect of Pu Prefecture (蒲州, roughly modern Yuncheng, Shanxi), before retiring on account of age and illness. After retirement, he was said to be much involved in Taoist alchemist practices to try to prolong life. He lived to his 90s, but the date of his death is not known.

== Notes and references ==
- Old Book of Tang, vol. 90.
- New Book of Tang, vol. 114.
- Zizhi Tongjian, vol. 205.
