= Wang Xuan (minister) =

Wang Xuan (王璿) was an official of Wu Zetian's Zhou dynasty, briefly serving as chancellor.

Despite Wang's high status, little is firmly established about his career except for the time that he served as chancellor—as, unusual for a chancellor, he did not have a biography in either the Old Book of Tang or the New Book of Tang. It is known that his clan was a prominent one, from what was one point Langye Commandery (琅邪, roughly modern Linyi, Shandong), that traced its ancestry all the way back to a descendant of the original Zhou dynasty's imperial house, then to officials of the Qin dynasty, Han dynasty, Cao Wei, Jin dynasty (266–420), Liu Song, Liang dynasty, and Chen dynasty. Wang Gui's great-grandfather Wang Meng (王猛, not to be confused with the great Former Qin chancellor of the same name) served as a provincial governor during Chen and carried the title of Duke of Yingyang. His grandfather Wang Kuang (王纊) served as a prefectural prefect during the Tang dynasty. His father Wang Dejian (王德儉) served as an imperial censor and was created the Baron of Guiren.

As of 692, Wang Xuan was serving as the minister of construction (營繕大臣, Yingshan Dachen) when Wu Zetian promoted him to be the minister of defense (夏官尚書, Xiaguan Shangshu). She also gave him the designation Tong Fengge Luantai Pingzhangshi (同鳳閣鸞臺平章事), making him a chancellor de facto. Just more than a month later, however, he, along with other chancellors Li Youdao, Yuan Zhihong, Cui Shenji, Li Yuansu, and other officials Kong Siyuan (孔思元), and Ren Linghui (任令輝), were falsely accused of crimes by Wu Zetian's secret police official Wang Hongyi. They were relieved from their posts and exiled to the Lingnan region. That was the last historical reference to Wang Xuan, and it is not known when he died, although it is known that his sons Wang Dayou (王大有), Wang Tongren (王同人), Wang Jiji (王既濟), Wang Xiuming (王休明), Wang Xiuguang (王休光), Wang Xiuming (王休名, note different character than his brother), and Wang Xiuyan (王休言) all later served as officials.

== Notes and references ==
- Zizhi Tongjian, vol. 205.
