= Tang Xiujing =

Tang dynasty official (627-712)

Tang Xiujing (唐休璟; 627–712), formal name Tang Xuan (唐璿) but went by the courtesy name of Xiujing, formally Duke Zhong of Song (宋忠公), was an official and general of the Chinese Tang dynasty and Wu Zetian's Zhou dynasty, serving as chancellor during the reigns of Wu Zetian, her sons Emperor Zhongzong and Emperor Ruizong and her grandson Emperor Shang.

== Background ==
Tang Xiujing was born in 627, during the reign of Emperor Taizong. His family was from the Tang dynasty capital Chang'an, and for generations had served as officials of Tang's predecessor dynasties Northern Zhou and Sui dynasty. Tang Xiujing's great-grandfather Tang Gui (唐規) served as a general during Northern Zhou and carried the title of Duke of Anyi. Tang Xiujing's grandfather Tang Zong (唐宗) served as the secretary general of Shuofang Commandery (朔方, roughly modern Yulin, Shaanxi) late in the reign of Emperor Yang of Sui, and was killed when Liang Shidu rose against Emperor Yang and captured Shuofang, as he refused to submit to Liang. Tang Xiujing's father Tang Xie (唐諧) served as the magistrate of Xianyang County (咸陽, in modern Xianyang, Shaanxi).

== During Emperor Gaozong's reign ==
Tang Xiujing passed the imperial examinations in his youth, and started his civil service career early in the reign of Emperor Gaozong (Emperor Taizong's son), during Emperor Gaozong's Yonghui era (650-656) by serving as the communications officer at the mansion of Emperor Gaozong's brother Li Ke the Prince of Wu. He did not distinguish himself, and later served as the census officer at Ying Prefecture (營州, roughly modern Zhaoyang, Liaoning).

In 679, Eastern Tujue tribes, which had submitted to Tang and had been governed by Tang's Chanyu Commandant (單于大都護府, headquartered in modern Hohhot, Inner Mongolia), rose against Tang rule and declared independence under Ashina Nishoufu (阿史那泥熟匐). They persuaded Xi and Khitan tribes to attack Ying Prefecture in coordination with them. The commandant at Ying Prefecture at that time, Zhou Daowu (周道務), sent Tang Xiujing to defend against the Xi and Khitan attack, and Tang Xiujing was successful. Because of this accomplishment, he was promoted to be the military advisor to the prefect of Feng Prefecture (豐州, roughly modern Bayan Nur, Inner Mongolia).

Ashina Nishoufu was soon killed by the Tang general Pei Xingjian (裴行儉), but eventually rebelled again, and by 683 Eastern Tujue was fully independent under the rule of Ashina Gudulu. In 683, Ashina Gudulu attacked Wei Prefecture (蔚州, roughly modern Datong, Shanxi) and killed its prefect LI Sijian (李思儉). When Tang Xiujing's superior, Cui Zhibian (崔智辯) the commandant at Feng Prefecture, tried to intercept Ashina Gudulu at Mount Zhaona (朝那山, in modern Baotou, Inner Mongolia), he was defeated and captured by Ashina Gudulu. In response, Emperor Gaozong considered withdrawing from Feng Prefecture and moving its residents to Ling (靈州, roughly modern Yinchuan, Ningxia) and Xia (夏州, roughly modern Yulin) Prefectures. Tang Xiujing submitted a petition opposing the idea, pointing out that Feng Prefecture had land that was fit for both husbandry and agriculture, and that it served as a defense for Ling and Xia Prefectures—that abandoning it would leave those prefectures open to attack. After Tang's petition, the proposal to abandon Feng Prefecture was not again discussed.

== During Empress Wu's regency ==
Emperor Gaozong died in 683 and was succeeded by his son Li Zhe the Crown Prince (as Emperor Zhongzong), but actual power was in the hands of Emperor Gaozong's powerful wife Empress Wu (later known as Wu Zetian), as empress dowager and regent. In spring 684, when Emperor Zhongzong displayed signs of independence, she deposed him and replaced him with his brother Li Dan the Prince of Yu (as Emperor Ruizong), but thereafter held onto power even more firmly. In Emperor Ruizong's Chuigong era (685-689), Tang Xiujing was made the deputy commandant of Anxi (安西, headquarters at Suyab (near modern Tokmok, Kyrgyzstan)).

In 689, after a failed campaign commanded by the chancellor Wei Daijia against Tufan in the same general region, Wei was reduced to commoner rank and exiled, and his assistant, Yan Wengu (閻溫古) the commandant of Anxi, was executed. Tang Xiujing was put in command of the remnants of Wei's army and made the commandant at Xi Prefecture (西州, roughly modern Turfan Prefecture, Xinjiang) to be in charge of the region.

== During Wu Zetian's reign ==
In 690, Empress Dowager Wu had Emperor Ruizong yield the throne to her, and she took the throne as "emperor," establishing a new Zhou dynasty and interrupting Tang. Around 692, Tang Xiujing suggested to her that a military campaign be launched to recover four important garrisons that had been lost to Tufan -- Qiuzi, Yutian, Shule, and Suyab. In response, Wu Zetian commissioned the general Wang Xiaojie, assisted by Ashina Zhongjie (阿史那忠節), to attack the Tufan forces of the region. Subsequently, during the Shengli era (697-700), Tang Xiujing was made the minister of military supplies (衛尉卿, Weiwei Qing) and the commandant at Liang Prefecture (涼州, roughly modern Wuwei, Gansu), further carrying a title as imperial censor, and he was in command of the forces in the region.

In fall 700, the Tufan general Khu Mangpoje Lhasung ("Qumangbuzhi" (麴莽布支) in Chinese) attacked Liang Prefecture and put Changsong (昌松, in modern Wuwei) under siege. Tang Xiujing was set to engage them at Hongyuan Valley (洪源谷, also in modern Wuwei), but his subordinates were distressed by the shiny armor that the Tufan forces were displaying. Tang responded:

Lun Qinling [(論欽陵, Tufan's regent who had dealt Tang forces many losses but who had committed suicide in 699 after a confrontation with the king Tridu Songtsen)] has died and Lun Zanpo [(論贊婆, Lun Qinling's brother)] has surrendered. Qumangbuzhi has just become a new general, and he wants to show his power, so he got his nation's noble young men to follow him. Although the soldiers and the horses look impressive, he does not understand military matters. Let me defeat them for you.

Tang then put on his armor and led the charge into Tibetan forces. He defeated Tibetan forces six times straight, killing 2,500 men and two of Qumangbuzhi's assistants. He stacked the bodies into a pile for display. In 702, when Tibet sent the emissary Lun Misa (論彌薩) to seek peace and Wu Zetian held a feast in Lun Misa's honor at the western capital Chang'an, Tang happened to be in Chang'an as well and was invited to the feast. During the feast, Lun Misa looked at Tang intently, and when Wu Zetian asked him why he did, he responded, "At the Battle of Hongyuan, no one could rival this general's ferocity, and therefore I want to look at him clearly." Wu Zetian promoted Tang Xiujing to be a commanding general of two of the imperial armies and kept him at the central government. It was said at the time that Tang was familiar with border affairs, as far east as Jieshi (碣石, in modern Qinhuangdao, Hebei) to the four garrisons of Anxi, knowing about all of the geographic features and defensive frameworks.

As of 703, Tang Xiujing was serving as the minister of defense (夏官尚書, Xiaguan Shangshu) and still in titular command of the armies around Liang Prefecture, when he was given the designation Tong Fengge Luantai Sanpin (同鳳閣鸞臺三品), making him a chancellor de facto. At that time, one of Western Tujue's constituent tribal chiefs, Wuzhile (烏質勒) the chief of the Tuqishi (突騎施) tribe, was having conflicts with other Western Tujue tribes, and as a consequence the communications with the Zhou garrisons in Anxi was cut off. Tang, after discussion with other chancellors, came up with a course of action and predicted what would happen next. When reports from Anxi arrived some 10 days later, they matched what Tang expected, and Wu Zetian stated, "I regret not using you earlier." She further turned to the other chancellors Wei Yuanzhong, Yang Zaisi, Li Jiao, Yao Yuanchong, and Li Jiongxiu, stating, "Tang Xiujing understands the border affairs well, and in this area, 10 of you together cannot match him." She also made him a member of the staff of Li Xian the Crown Prince (the former Emperor Zhongzong, who had been recalled from exile in 698 and made crown prince, further having his name changed).

In 704, in response to the problem that imperial officials were not willing to be local officials, Tang and Li Jiao suggested that the officials at the central government be assigned to the prefectures and counties to serve as officials, offering to go first themselves. Wu Zetian had 20 officials randomly drawn, and neither Li nor Tang was sent out. Later that year, when fellow chancellor Wei Anshi submitted an indictment against Wu Zetian's lovers Zhang Yizhi and Zhang Changzong, Wu Zetian had Wei and Tang investigate, but before investigations could be complete, there were reports that Khitan and Xi were set to attack the northeastern border, and she gave Tang the additional titles as the commandant of You and Ying Prefectures (headquartered in modern Beijing) and protectorate general of Andong to defend against Khitan and Xi. Before Tang was set to depart the capital Luoyang, he secretly spoke with Li Xian, stating, "The two Zhangs depend too much on the favors of the emperor and have lost their proper places as subjects. Surely a disturbance will come. Your Royal Highness should be careful."

== During Emperor Zhongzong's second reign ==
In 705, Wu Zetian was overthrown in a coup, and Li Xian was restored to the throne. He recalled Tang Xiujing, conferring on him the honorific title of Fuguo Da Jiangjun (輔國大將軍, literally "grand general who assists the state"), and Tang continued to serve as chancellor with the designation Tong Zhongshu Menxia Sanpin (同中書門下三品). He soon made Tang Zuo Pushe (左僕射), one of the heads of the executive bureau of government (尚書省, Shangshu Sheng) and still chancellor with the Tong Zhongshu Menxia Sanpin. He also put Tang in charge of Chang'an, now again the main capital, as at that time he was at Luoyang, now eastern capital. He also initially created Tang the Duke of Jiuquan, and then the greater title of Duke of Song.

Tang retired in spring 706, but in 708 he was referred to as an advisor to the Crown Prince. That year, when the general Zhang Rendan proposed that three forts be built north of the Yellow River to control the Tujue population, Tang opposed the project, but the forts were built anyway and were effective in their purpose of controlling the Tujue population. It was said that Tang was not content in his retirement and, seeking to return to chancellor position, had his son marry the adopted daughter of one of the powerful women at Emperor Zhongzong's court, the senior lady in waiting Lady Helou, and in winter 709, he was again made chancellor with the Tong Zhongshu Menxia Sanpin designation, drawing much popular criticism, although he was also praised for using his wealth as a duke to help his clansmen and reburying deceased ones properly. In any case, his term of service as chancellor was said to be an undistinguished one. In spring 710, there was an occasion when Emperor Zhongzong had the high level officials play games of cuju and tug of war. It was said that Tang and fellow chancellor Wei Juyuan, due to their old age, fell and could not get up, drawing much laughs from the imperial household.

== During Emperor Shang's reign and Emperor Ruizong's second reign ==
In summer 710, Emperor Zhongzong died suddenly—a death that traditional historians believed to be a poisoning by his powerful wife Empress Wei and daughter Li Guo'er the Princess Anle. His son by a concubine, Li Chongmao the Prince of Wen, was named emperor (as Emperor Shang), but Empress Wei retained power as empress dowager and regent. Less than a month later, she and Li Guo'er were killed in a coup led by Emperor Zhongzong's sister Princess Taiping and nephew Li Longji the Prince of LInzi (a son of Li Dan the Prince of Xiang, the former Emperor Ruizong). Emperor Shang was deposed, and Li Dan returned to the throne. Late that year, Tang Xiujing retired again and was allowed to continue to receive salaries as an official of the first rank (highest in Tang dynasty's nine-rank civil service system). He died in 712 and was buried with honor.
