= Wu Youning =

Wu Youning (武攸寧), formally the Duke of Jiang (江公), was an imperial prince during the reign of Wu Zetian and served as chancellor both during her regency over her son Emperor Ruizong of Tang and her own reign.

It is not known when Wu Youning was born. Wu Youning's grandfather Wu Shirang (武士讓) was an older brother to Wu Zetian's father Wu Shihuo. As of spring 690, when Wu Zetian was empress dowager and regent over Emperor Ruizong, Wu Youning was serving as Fengge Shilang (鳳閣侍郎), the deputy head of the legislative bureau of government (鳳閣, Fengge), when she made him Nayan (納言) -- the head of the examination bureau (鸞臺, Luantai) and a post considered one for a chancellor. Later that year, when she had Emperor Ruizong yield the throne to her and took the throne herself as "emperor" of a new Zhou dynasty, interrupting Tang dynasty, she created a large number of her Wu clan relatives imperial princes, and Wu Youning was created the Prince of Jianchang.

In fall 691, Wu Youning was removed from his post as Nayan, and was made a commanding general of the imperial guards. One month later, however, he was again made Nayan. In fall 692, as a part of a major reorganization of her government, Wu Zetian made him the minister of public works (冬官尚書, Dongguan Shangshu), no longer a chancellor. It was said that when Wu Youning and his cousin Wu Sansi were in power, they established offices to confiscate rich individuals' properties, and that some 17 or 18 individuals had their properties confiscated by them. Wu Youning stored what he gained in large storages, which were destroyed in a large fire.

In 705, Wu Zetian was overthrown in a coup led by the officials Zhang Jianzhi, Cui Xuanwei, Jing Hui, Huan Yanfan, and Yuan Shuji. Her son Li Xian the Crown Prince (Emperor Ruizong's older brother), who had previously reigned as emperor, was restored to the throne (as Emperor Zhongzong). Jing proposed that the Wu imperial princes' titles be removed, but Emperor Zhongzong declined to do so, instead demoting their titles slightly, and Wu Youning's title was reduced to Duke of Jiang. He died early in the Shenlong era (705-707), while serving as the prefect of Qi Prefecture (岐州, roughly modern Baoji, Shaanxi).
