= Wu Zhou =

Chinese imperial dynasty (690–705)

Zhou 周
- 690–705
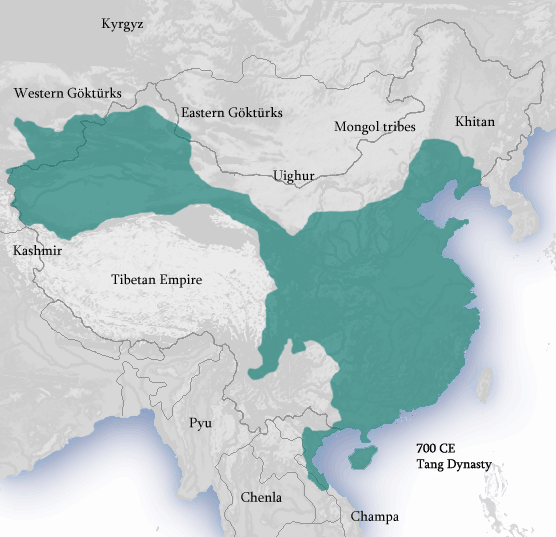
- Wu Zhou, c. 700
- Status: Empire
- Capital: Shendu (Luoyang)
- Common languages: Chinese
- Religion: Buddhism (state religion), Taoism, Confucianism, Chinese folk religion
- Government: Absolute monarchy
- Emperor
  - 690–705: Wu Zetian
- History
  - Established by Wu Zetian: 17 October 690
  - Emperor Wu Zetian deposed: 21 February 705
- Currency: Chinese coin, Chinese cash
Preceded by
Tang dynasty
Succeeded by
Tang dynasty
Second Turkic Khaganate
Balhae

Zhou (Chinese: 周), known in historiography as the Wu Zhou (Chinese: 武周), was a short-lived Chinese imperial dynasty that existed between 690 and 705. The dynasty consisted of the reign of one female emperor, Wu Zhao (Wu Zetian), who usurped the throne of her son, the Emperor Ruizong of Tang, in 690. The dynasty lasted until another one of Wu Zhao's sons, the Emperor Zhongzong of Tang, was restored to the throne in the Shenlong Coup in 705, marking the restoration of the Tang dynasty. Historians generally regard the Wu Zhou as an interregnum of the Tang dynasty.

Wu named her dynasty after the ancient Zhou dynasty, from whom she believed herself to be descended.

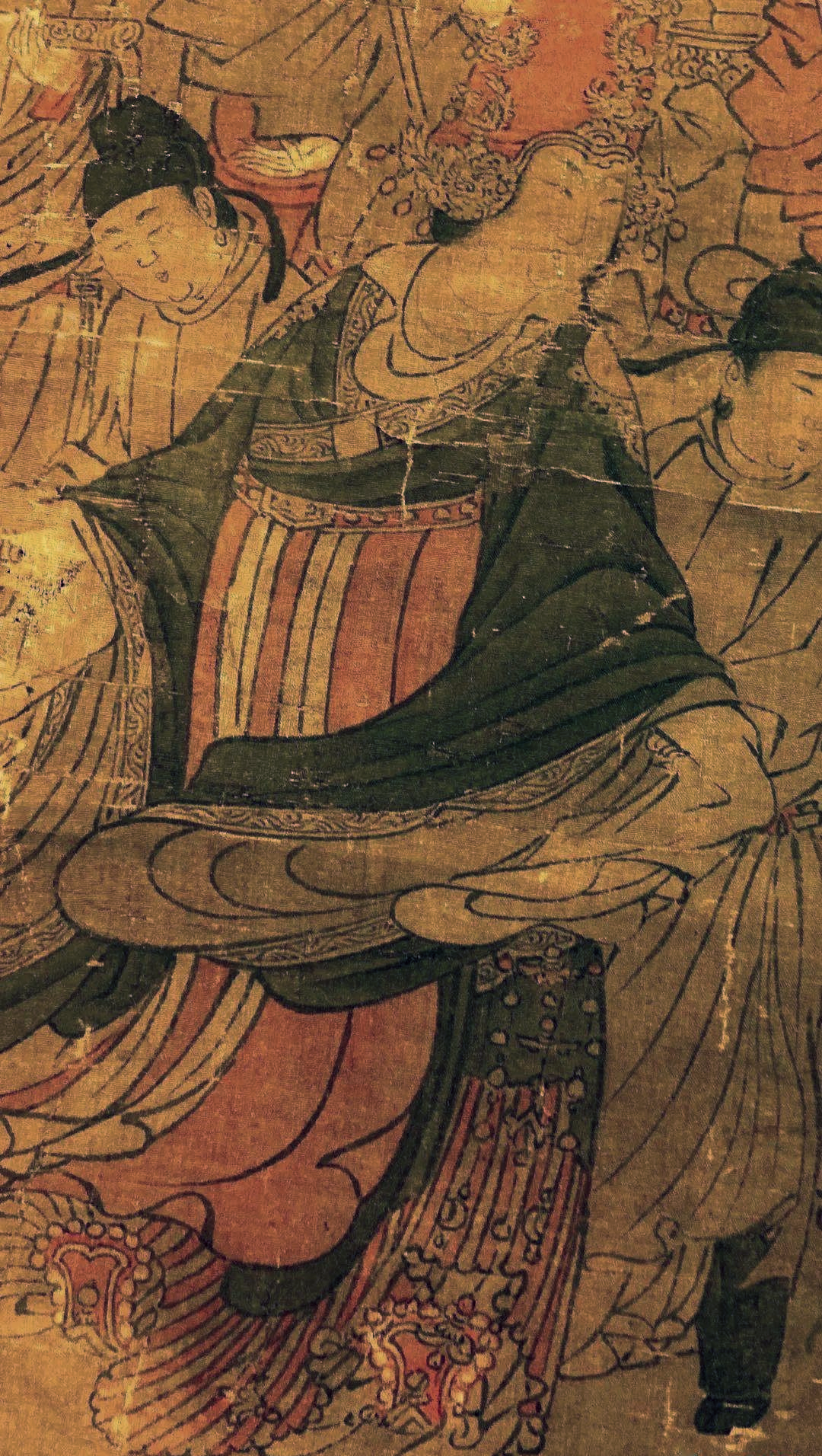
Detail of Tang Emperor travels with attendants, by Zhang Xuan, depicting Wu Zetian and attendants.

== Background ==
Before her coronation, Wu Zhao (as she was then known), was often acting as de facto regent for her husband, Emperor Gaozong, or her sons, giving her a head-start in accomplishing her aims, which she then consolidated as huangdi (emperor) of Zhou once she became ruler in name as well. Beginning in 655, Wu began to preside over court meetings in the name of the emperor, and she co-ruled with Emperor Gaozong until his death. After Gaozong's death, she ruled in name of her sons, who reigned officially as puppet emperors while power was completely and solely in her hands. In 690, she deposed her son, Emperor Ruizong, and established her Zhou Dynasty with herself as huangdi.

== History ==
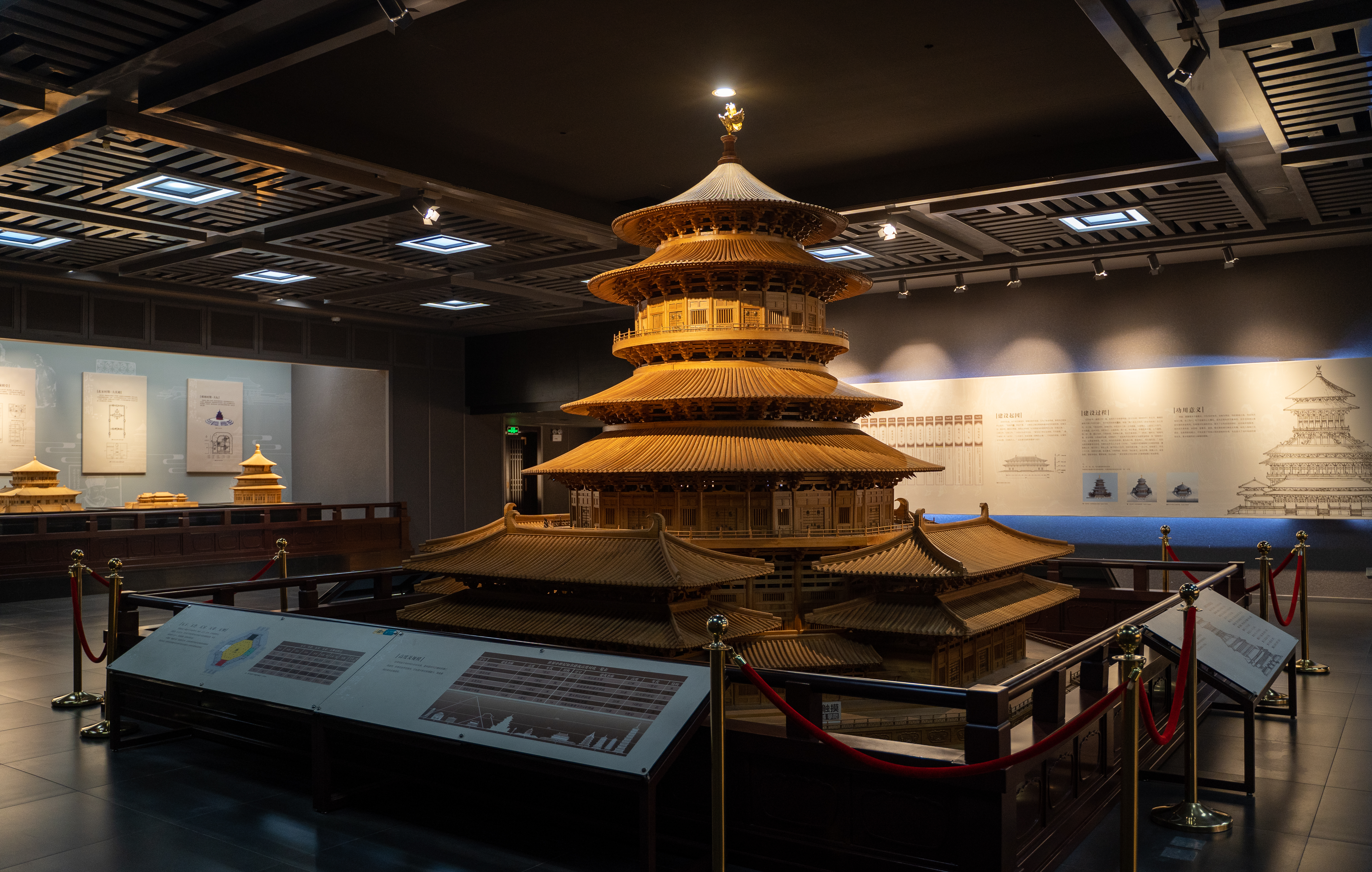
Model of Bright Hall of Luoyang commissioned by Wu Zetian (original 294 chi = 93m tall). Many major construction projects were started during Wu Zetian's time.

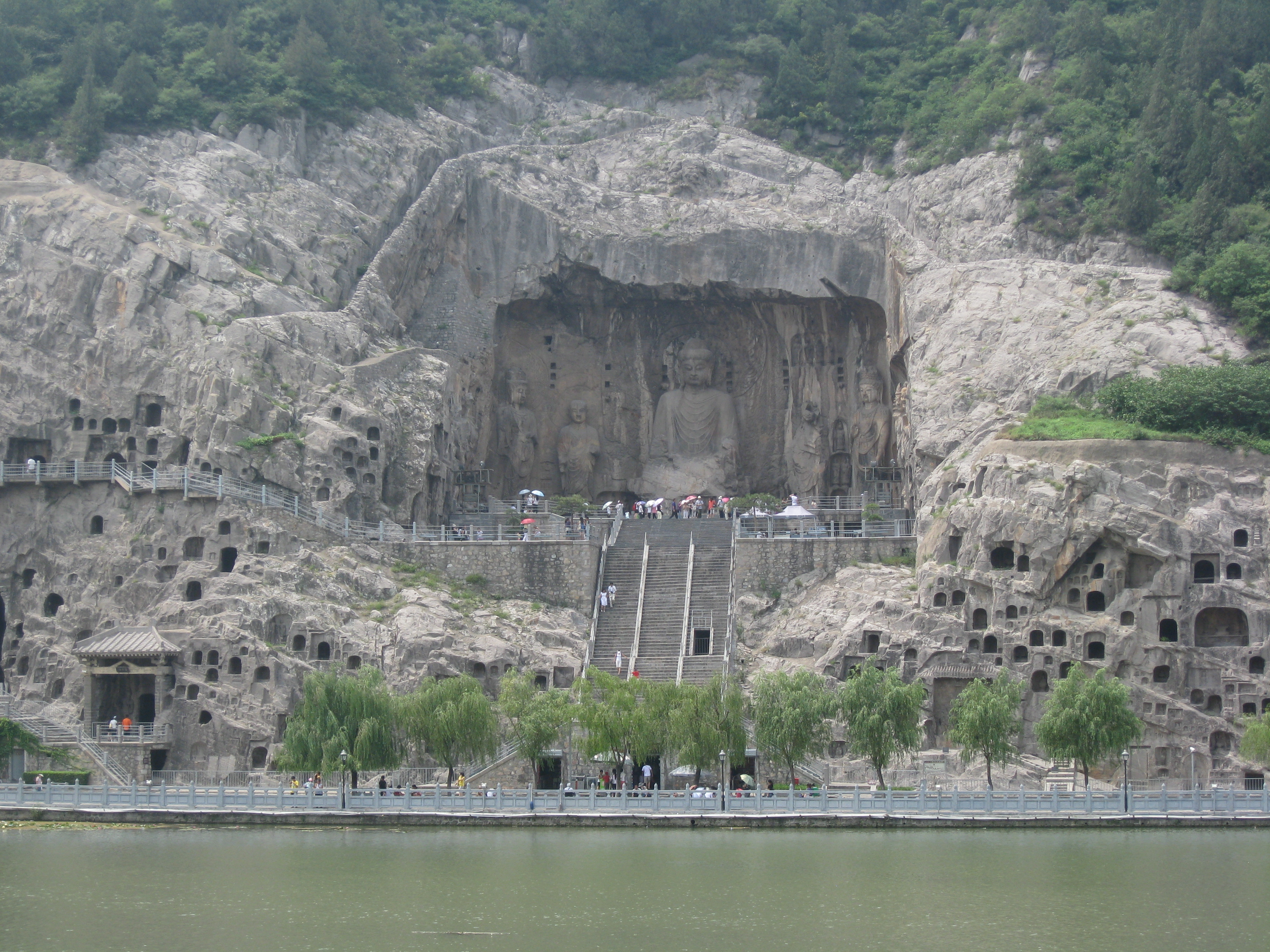
Longmen Grottoes, begun before the life of Wu Zetian, she contributed greatly to them, both as wife of Gaozu and during her subsequent Zhou dynasty. In 2000 the site was inscribed upon the UNESCO World Heritage List as "an outstanding manifestation of human artistic creativity"

The dynasty's capital was Luoyang, which she renamed "Shendu" (神都 "Divine Capital"). Evidence suggests that women were granted more privileges during her reign, and China was in a state of great prosperity during her rule.

The dynasty's state religions were Buddhism and Daoism, both of which Wu Zetian exploited for self-promoting propaganda. The monk Xue Huaiyi claimed to have found a document predicting the reign of a woman of great merit who would become universal ruler. In support of her imperial ambitions, Wu Zetian also proclaimed herself "Sage Mother", having statues of Laozi's mother as "Sage Mother" placed in Daoist temples

Wu Zetian became a very active supporter of Buddhism. Furthermore, she claimed to be an incarnation of Maitreya, writing a document called the Great Cloud Sutra, which prophesied that a female emperor would eradicate illness, worry, and disaster from the world. She sought the support of the Buddhist clergy to this end. In 673, Wu provided 20,000 cash for a gigantic statue of Maitreya at Longmen Grottoes. Unlike her predecessor's dynasty, Wu Zetian selected people in her government based on their skills, and not on their status. The Buddhist clergy created a document called Commentary on the Meaning of the Prophecy about Shenhuang, which predicted a female Chakravartin who would rule the Jambudvipa as the reincarnation of Vimalaprabha. This document was presented to Wu Zetian two months before the proclamation of the Zhou Dynasty.

Various other documents were also written such as The Great Spell of Unsullied Pure Light, also predicting the rise of a female monarch, of which Wu Zetian ordered 100,000 copies be printed and distributed.

Traditionalist Chinese historiography considers the dynasty as a period of the Tang dynasty, as Wu was also the former empress consort of a Tang emperor and was buried in Qianling Mausoleum, a Tang royal mausoleum. Furthermore, Wu Zetian was the only emperor of Zhou China, which does not fit the concept of a dynasty. There were, however, other dynasties of a similar length, such as the Xin dynasty, or much shorter in length, such as the Shun dynasty. Wu Zetian's rule was long also seen as a period of great tyranny, though, in more recent decades, this seems to have lessened or reversed, as the appearance of Wu Zetian in countless Chinese works of fiction seems to depict her as a wise ruler.

Nevertheless, historically, her reign began and continued with extensive violence, combined with the use of secret police and a network of informers. The debate about Wu's use of violence and coercion is more as to how some of it may have been exaggerated and how much of it was necessary for her own survival, particularly given the animosity of the clans of old nobility of the northern China plain that adamantly opposed her, together with a social and political system which found a woman of her accomplishments to be anathema solely on the basis of gender.

== Achievements ==
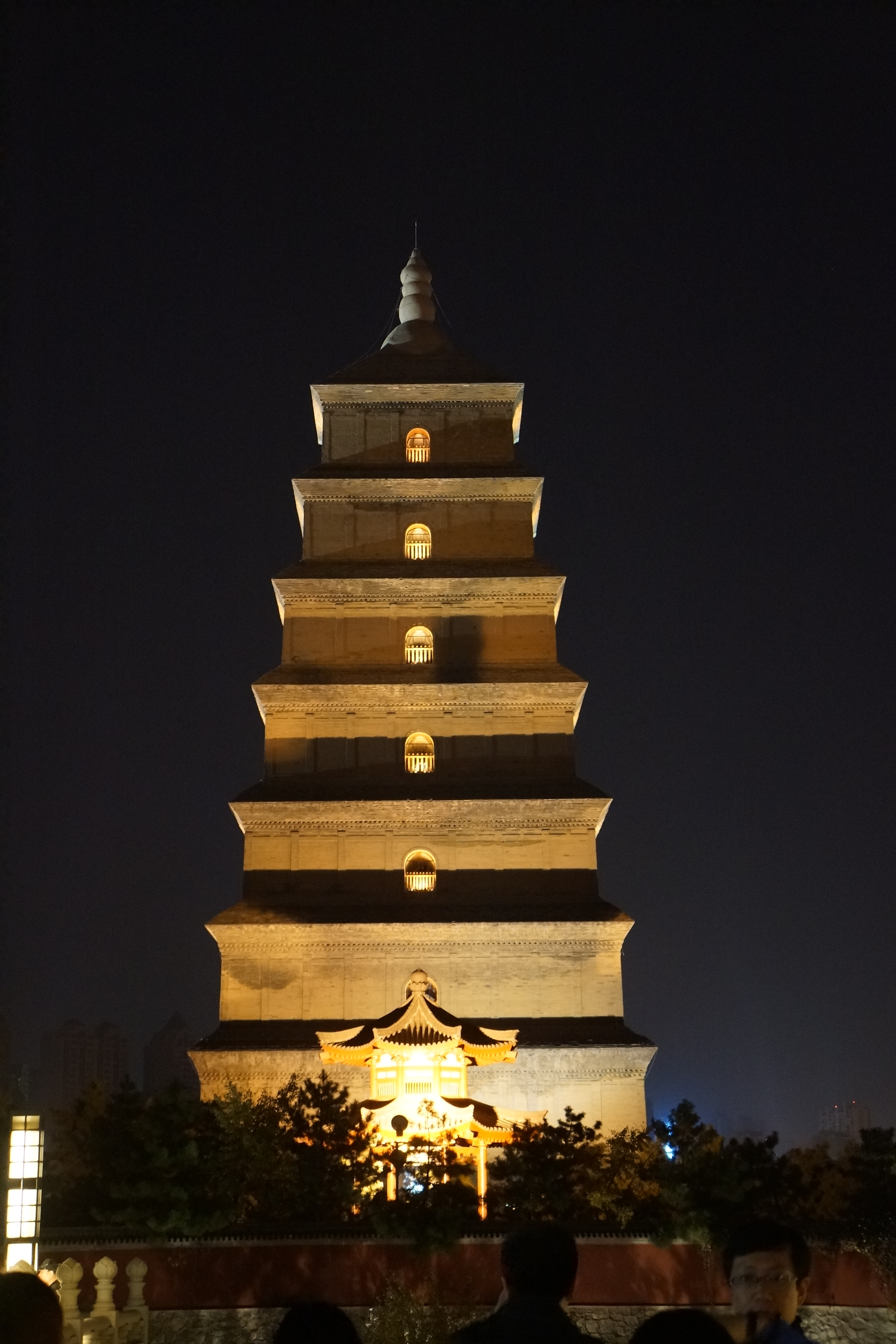
Giant Wild Goose Pagoda, re-built during the Wu Zhou dynasty

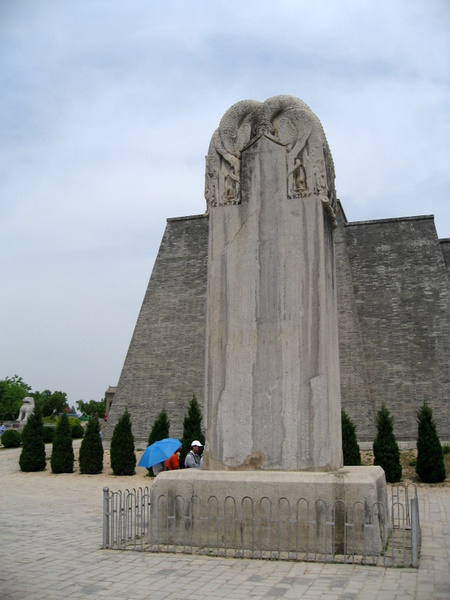
The Unwritten Monument, erected by Wu Zetian without the usual inscribing of text, due to her view that what she had to express was too sublime to be expressed in words. Located in the Qianling Mausoleum.

The Wu Zhou dynasty had many achievements both in a broader historical sense as well as in contrast to the reigns of Emperors Zhongzong and Ruizong whose reigns bracketed hers, and in contrast to her weak and sickly husband Emperor Gaozong of Tang. Wu's reign resulted in a greater level of Chinese imperial power both externally and internally. This was accomplished along with diminishing the power of the old official class, drawn from the traditionally powerful clans, thus greatly changing the dynamics of power in China. Wu Zetian greatly enhanced the prestige and effectiveness of the civil service recruitment tests, filling government positions by skills demonstrated in written examinations, and opening them up to men of all classes. She followed this with popular promotions and increased salaries. Wu issued Acts of Grace and other decrees of relief for the commons, and funded religious activities.

However, toward the end of her reign she lost popular support due to the influence of the two young Zhang brothers she took as lovers and the resulting corruption in government. When her court officials intervened, they killed the Zhang brothers. Wu Zetian abdicated the next day, and the so-called Zhou dynasty fizzled to an end with the restoration of the Tang. Nevertheless, some of Wu Zetian's achievements have left their mark on history, such as the emphasis in subsequent Chinese history on merit-based examinations, as well as extant monuments, including huge parts of Longmen Grottoes. Wu Zetian was personally an author and poet, with many surviving works, including sixty-one essays under her name recorded in the Quan Tangwen "Collected Tang Essays" and forty-six poems collected in the Complete Tang Poems anthology of Tang poetry. Wu Zetian and her court left a remarkable legacy of poetry and literature from the end of Gaozu's reign and even more so during her Zhou dynasty period, during which the Zhuying ji poetry anthology was published, the poets of which were very influential to the subsequent flourishing of Tang poetry. Thus, though the Zhou dynasty failed to take root as an actual dynasty, it was one of the more important eras in Chinese history, and of influence on modern global culture.

== See also ==
- Xin dynasty, a similarly short-lived interregnum established by Wang Mang during the Han dynasty

== Bibliography ==
- Barrett, T. H. (2008). The Woman Who Discovered Printing. New Haven, Connecticut: Yale University Press. ISBN 978-0-300-12728-7.
- Paludan, Ann (1998). Chronicle of the Chinese Emperors: The Reign-by-Reign Record of the Rulers of Imperial China. New York, New York: Thames and Hudson. ISBN 0-500-05090-2.
