= Early Snow on the River =

Painting by Zhao Gan

- 江行初雪圖 (Jiāng xíng chūxuě tú) (Chinese)
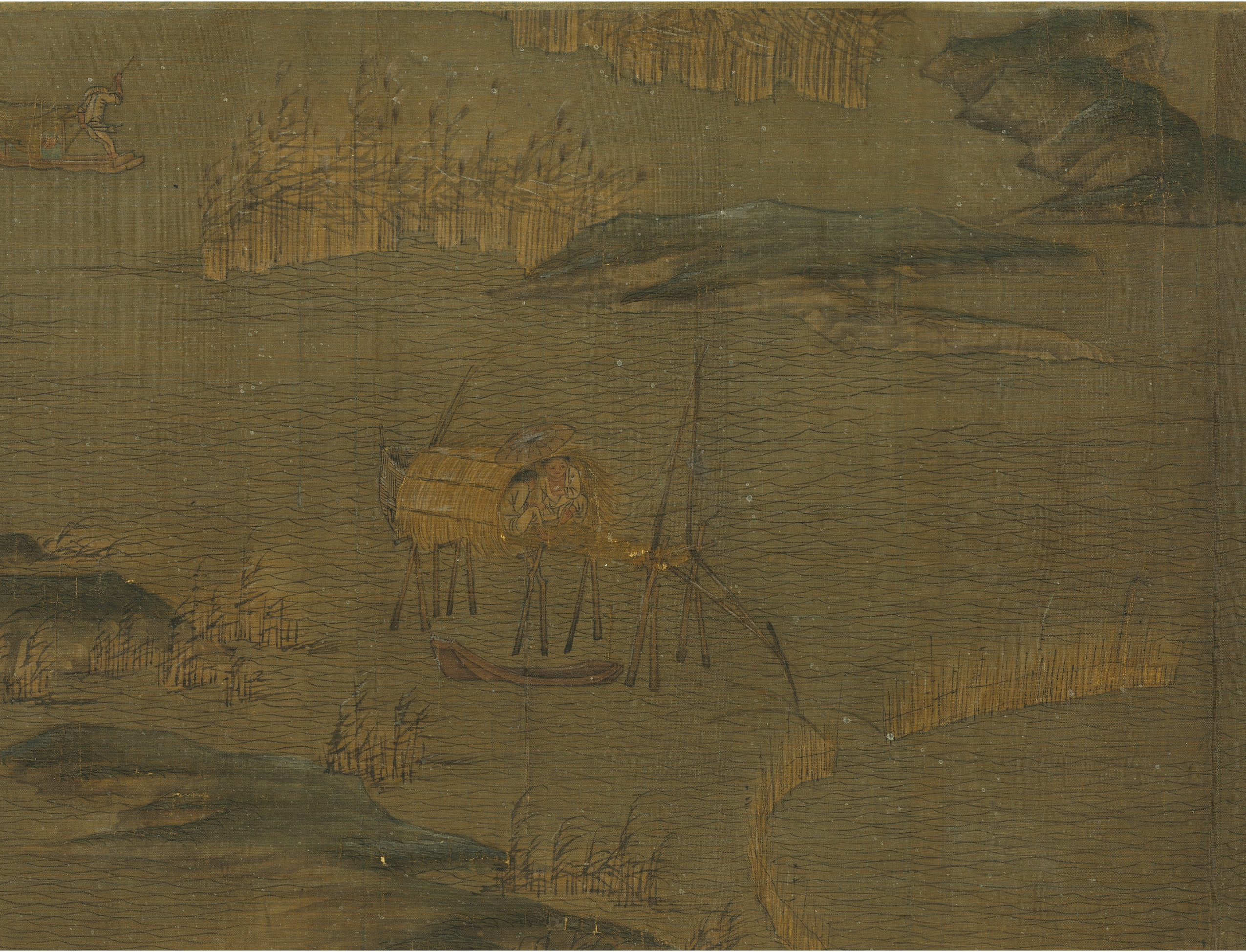
- Artist: Zhao Gan
- Year: 10th century
- Medium: Handscroll
- Dimensions: 25.9 cm x 376.5 cm
- Location: National Palace Museum, Taipei
- Accession: 故畫000964N000000000

Early Snow on the River (Traditional Chinese: 江行初雪圖, Pinyin: Jiāng xíng chūxuě tú) is a Chinese landscape painting created by artist Zhao Gan (趙幹) created in the 10th century, during the Five Dynasties and Ten Kingdoms period. It is a prominent example of the shanshui genre, dedicated to mountains and waterscapes done with brush and ink from the era, and is the only extant surviving piece by Zhao Gan. From the seal impressions annotating the piece, it was a prominent piece in the collections of Chinese imperial families across multiple dynasties. It is currently held by the National Palace Museum in Taipei, Taiwan.

== Background ==
Not much is known about the life of artist Zhao Gan aside from the fact that he was a native of Jiangsu Province, and that he spent much of his life in Jiangnan, south of the Yangtze River, as such, the painting shows the fertile, watery climate of the region.

The annotation of one such Emperor among the Ten Kingdoms, Li Yu of the Southern Tang (reign 961–976), annotated the text verifying the existence and credit of the work to the artist.

「江行初雪畫院學生趙幹狀.」

"Early Snow on the River by Student Zhao Gan of the Southern Tang,"

Li Yu, the last ruler of the dynasty, before his demise by the hands of the Song dynasty, was a calligrapher and the patron of the arts, founded an art school that in addition to Zhao Gan, included contemporary painters such as Dong Yuan, Juran, and Xu Xi. It is among Li Yu's two calligraphic pieces, the second piece being Han Gan's Night-Shining White.

== Description ==
The landscape of Jiangsu Province is prominent in the landscape, and it features 30 figures, mainly featuring the daily life of the residents of Jiangnan.

Seen from right to left, the painting depicts a winter landscape as indicated by the bare trees and dry reeds. A third of the scroll depicts a group of travelers traversing the Yangtze on their mules, enduring the harsh winds and shivering, flecks of white pigment present illustrating a snowstorm in progress. Throughout the painting, along the river, local fisherman are seen fishing along the banks. Art historian James Francis Cahill noted the contrast to later landscape paintings which depicts fishing as a more leisurely activity.

The textures of the trees are bold and twisted, with the trunks utilizing washes and dry strokes to emphasize lighting and volume, and in addition, the reeds are shown with flicks of the brush. The rendering of the trees indicate that the painting was made prior to the Northern Song.

After the capture of Li Yu, Zhao's painting ended up in the collection of Emperor Huizong and was catalogued in the Xuanhe Huapu.

From the annotations of the text of the painting, on the 11th month of 1329, the painting entered the collection of Jayaatu Khan Tugh Temür (Emperor Wenzong of Yuan), whose ownership of the painting was seen as a reminder of his duties to his subjects, as according to Cahill, the painting evokes the hardships of the everyman.

Subsequently, Zhao's painting has seen continuous ownership in the Southern Tang, the Song, the Yuan, the Ming, and the Qing courts before its present-day ownership by the National Palace Museum.

== Full handscroll ==
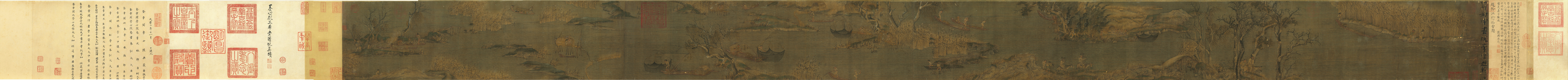
Full length of the scroll

== See also ==
- Herd of Deer - a set of two 10th-century paintings, recognized within the Yuan and Qing Imperial Courts, also in the National Palace Museum collection
