= Prince Yide =

Li Chongrun
- Crown Prince Yide

Imperial Grandson 皇太孫
- Reign: 682-683
- Born: c. 2 March 682
- Died: 8 October 701 (aged 19)
- Spouse: Lady Pei (posthumously married)
Names
- Birth name: Li Chongzhao 李重照
Posthumous name
- Crown Prince Yide 懿德太子
- Father: Emperor Zhongzong of Tang
- Mother: Empress Wei

Li Chongrun (Chinese: 李重潤; pinyin: Lǐ Chóngrùn; c. 2 March 682 – October 8, 701), né Li Chongzhao (Chinese: 李重照; pinyin: Lǐ Chóngzhào), posthumous name Crown Prince Yide (Chinese: 懿德太子; pinyin: Yìdé Tàizǐ ), was an imperial prince of the Tang dynasty and the Wu Zhou dynasty. He was the only son of Emperor Zhongzong and Emperor Zhongzong's second wife Empress Wei. In 701, he offended his grandmother Wu Zetian by discussing Wu Zetian's lovers Zhang Yizhi and Zhang Changzong with his sister Li Xianhui the Lady Yongtai and her husband Wu Yanji (武延基) the Prince of Wei, and he, along with Li Xianhui and Wu Yanji, were forced to commit suicide. He was posthumously honored as crown prince after his father Emperor Zhongzong was restored to the throne in 705 and in 706, Emperor Zhongzong provided Li Chongrun with an honorable burial by interring his remains at the Qian Mausoleum.

== During Emperor Gaozong's reign and Emperors Zhongzong and Ruizong's first reigns ==
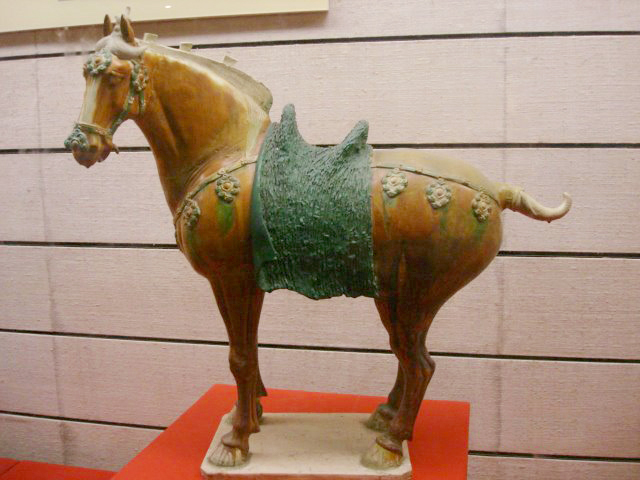
A sancai ceramic horse figurine from the tomb of Li Chongrun, now on display in the Shaanxi History Museum

Li Chongrun, then named Li Chongzhao, was born in c.March 682, to then-Crown Prince Li Zhe and Li Zhe's wife Crown Princess Wei. When Li Chongzhao was about two months old, on 7 May 682, Li Zhe's father and mother Emperor Gaozong and Empress Wu created Li Chongzhao the unprecedented title of Deputy Crown Prince (皇太孫, Huang Taisun) and gave him a staff. When Emperor Gaozong became ill at the eastern capital Luoyang late in 683, Emperor Gaozong and Empress Wu summoned Li Zhe to Luoyang and left the capital Chang'an, where Li Zhe was previously in charge, nominally under Li Chongzhao, but with the chancellor Liu Rengui actually in charge. Later that year, Emperor Gaozong died, and Li Zhe succeeded him (as Emperor Zhongzong), although Li Zhe's mother Empress Wu still had all actual power, as empress dowager.

In spring 684, after Emperor Zhongzong showed signs of independence, Empress Dowager Wu deposed him and reduced him to the title of Prince of Lulin, replacing him with Li Chongzhao's uncle Li Dan the Prince of Yu (as Emperor Ruizong). Shortly thereafter, Li Chongzhao was reduced to commoner rank. It is not completely clear, but he appeared to have been exiled with his parents to Jun Prefecture (均州, in modern Shiyan, Hubei). It might have been around that time that he was renamed to Li Chongrun, to observe naming taboo of Empress Dowager Wu's personal name.

== During Wu Zetian's reign ==
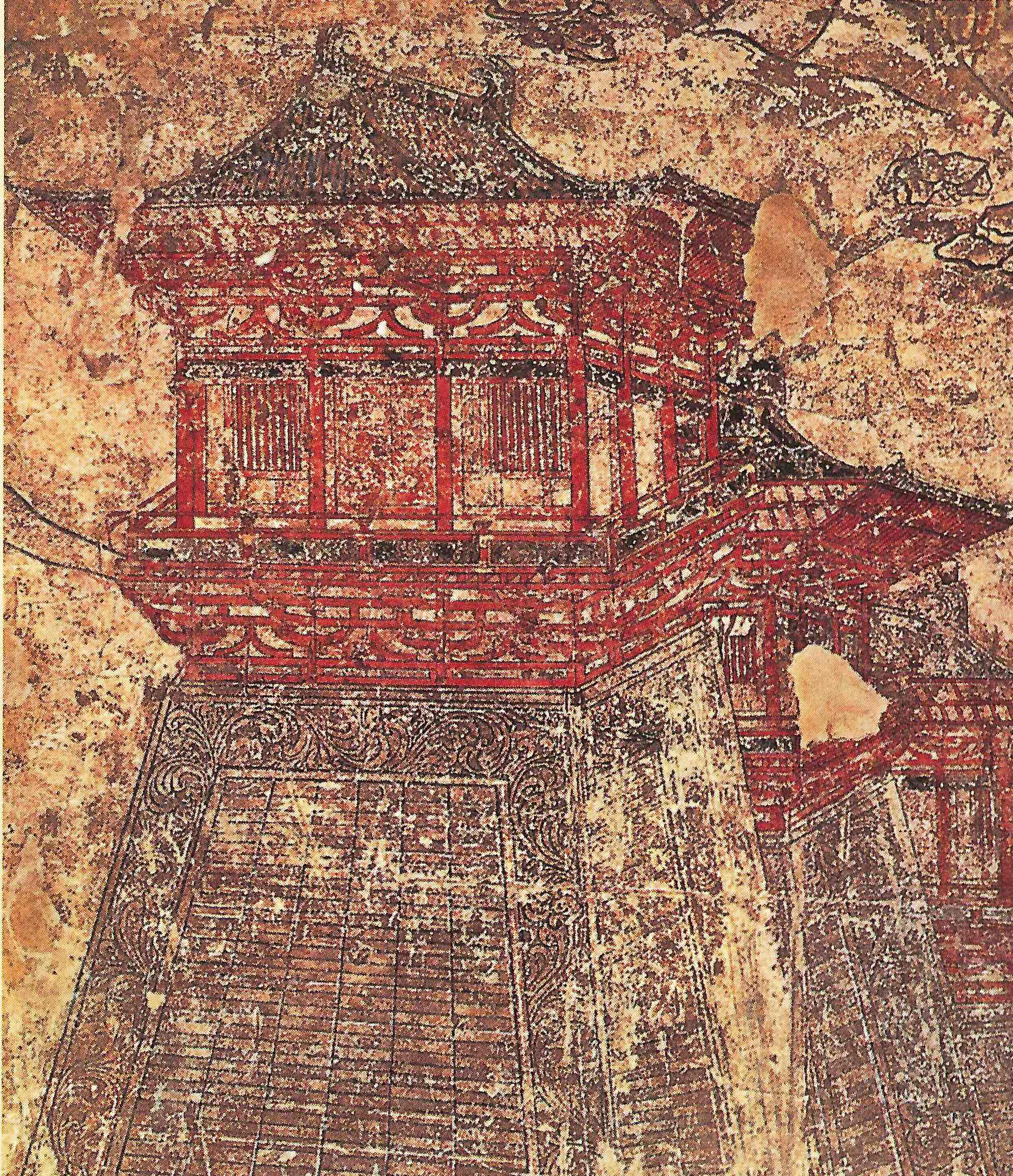
Que towers along the walls of Tang-era Chang'an, 8th-century mural from Li Chongrun's tomb at the Qianling Mausoleum in Shaanxi

Meanwhile, in 690, Li Chongrun's grandmother Empress Dowager Wu forced his uncle Emperor Ruizong to yield the throne to her, interrupting Tang dynasty and establishing her own Zhou dynasty with her as "emperor" (thereafter known as Wu Zetian). In 698, under the advice of the chancellor Di Renjie, she recalled Li Zhe to Luoyang, which had been made capital. Soon thereafter, Li Dan, who had been made crown prince when he yielded the throne, offered to yield the position of crown prince to Li Zhe. Wu Zetian agreed, and created Li Zhe crown prince, changing his personal name to Xian and further changing his surname to Wu. She created Li Chongrun the Prince of Shao.

As of 701, in her old age, Wu Zetian had allowed her lovers Zhang Yizhi and Zhang Changzong to handle much of the affairs of state. Li Chongrun was not pleased with this state of affairs, and had discussed the issue with his sister Li Xianhui the Lady Yongtai and her husband Wu Yanji the Prince of Wei (Wu Zetian's grandnephew). This discussion was somehow leaked, and Zhang Yizhi and Zhang Changzong complained to Wu Zetian. In anger, she ordered that the three of them be forced to commit suicide (or, possibly, be caned to death).

It was said that Li Chongrun was handsome, filially pious, and caring for his siblings, and that his death was much mourned by the people. In 705, after Emperor Zhongzong was restored to the throne after a coup, he ordered that Li Chongrun and Li Xianhui be reburied with honors usually only due emperors, near the tomb of Emperor Gaozong. He also posthumously honored Li Chongrun as Crown Prince Yide and Li Xianhui as Princess Yongtai. He had the deceased daughter of the official Pei Cui (裴粹) be posthumously married to Li Chongrun and had her buried with Li Chongrun.

== Notes and references ==
- Old Book of Tang, vol.86.
- New Book of Tang, vol.81.
- Zizhi Tongjian, vols. 203, 207, 208.
