= Princess Yongtai =

Chinese princess (685–701)

Princess Yongtai 永泰公主
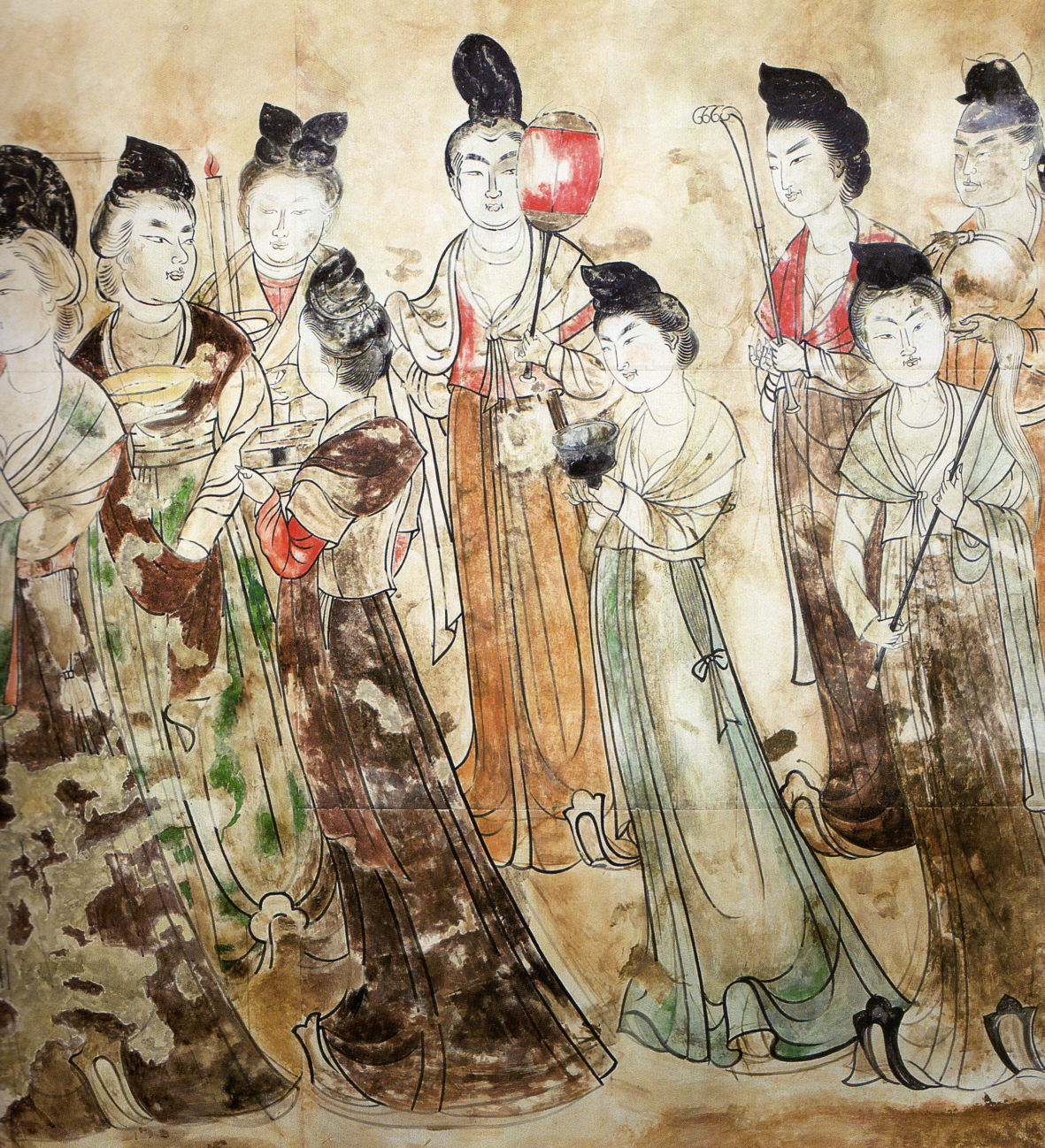
- Tang court ladies from a mural in Li Xianhui's tomb. The actual murals have been replaced by replicas, as the originals are now kept in the Shaanxi History Museum to better preserve them.
- Born: 685
- Died: October 9, 701 (aged 15–16)
- Burial: Qianling Mausoleum, Shaanxi
- Spouse: Wu Yanji, Prince of Wei
Names
- Family name: Li; Given name: Xianhui; Courtesy name: Nonghui
- House: Li
- Father: Emperor Zhongzong of Tang
- Mother: Empress Wei

Princess Yongtai (Chinese: 永泰公主; Wade–Giles: Yung-t'ai), born Li Xianhui (Chinese: 李仙蕙; pinyin: Lǐ Xiānhuì); 685 – October 9, 701), courtesy name Nonghui (穠輝), was a princess of the Tang dynasty.

== Life ==
Princess Yongtai was the seventh daughter of Emperor Zhongzong of Tang and the second daughter of Empress Wei. She married Wu Yanji (武延基), Prince of Wei, a grandnephew of Wu Zetian.

The cause of Princess Yongtai's death is widely disputed. According to her brother Prince Yide's biographies in both the Old and New Books of Tang, she, her husband and her brother were found to have criticised Wu Zetian's lovers Zhang Yizhi and Zhang Changzong and were caned to death. In the Zizhi Tongjian, the three were forced to commit suicide. In contrast, the epitaph from her tomb suggests that she died in childbirth. After Wu Zetian's death, when her father again came to the throne, she and her brother were reburied in grand tombs in the Qianling Mausoleum in 705.

== Tomb ==
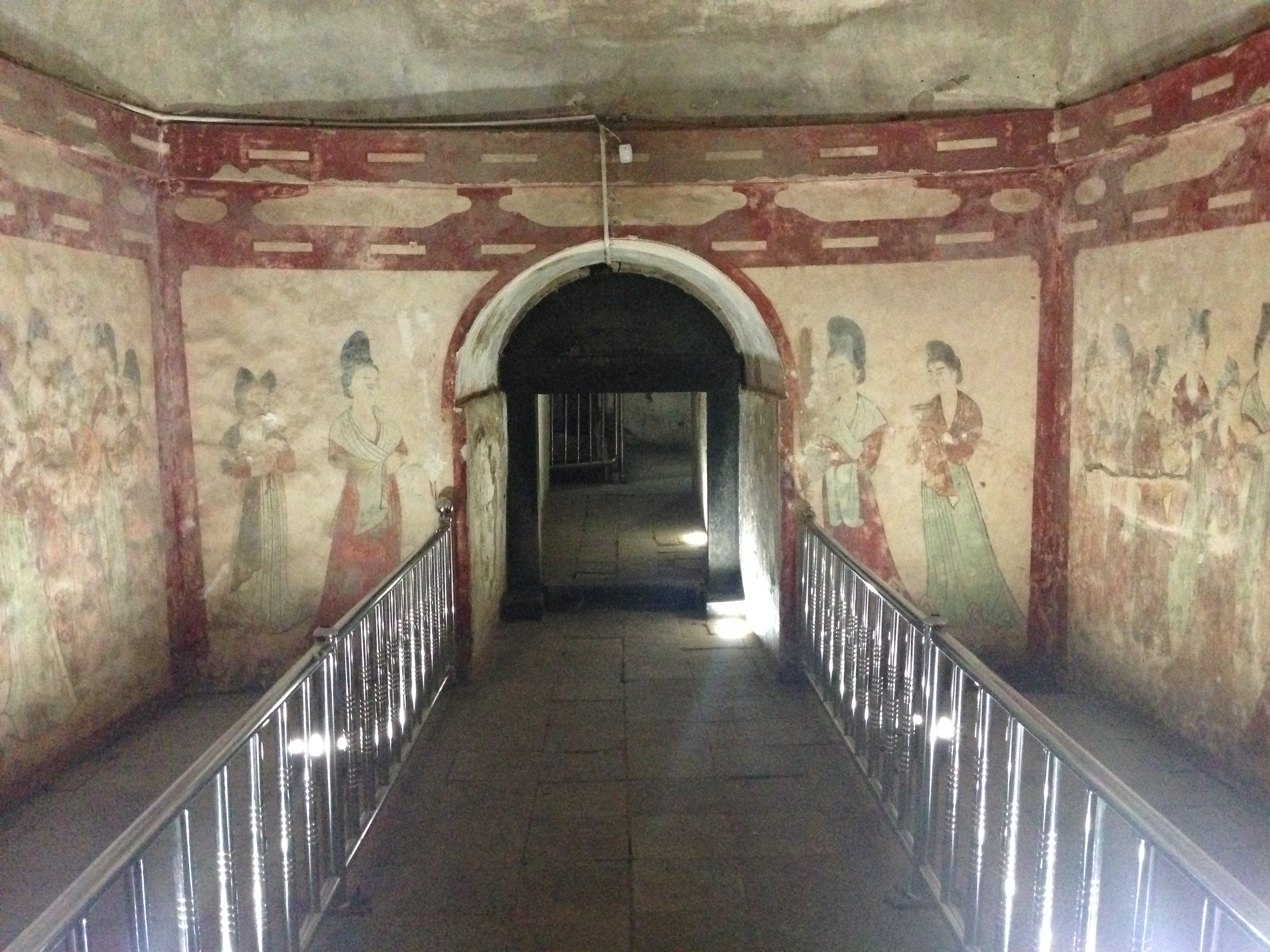
Tomb ante-chamber, the burial chamber with the stone sarcophagus are beyond

Li's tomb was discovered in 1960, and excavated from 1964. Among the Qianling Mausoleum burials, Li's is the largest belonging to a woman. It had been robbed in the past, probably soon after the burial, and items in precious materials taken, but the thieves had not bothered with the over 800 pottery tomb figures, and the extensive frescoes were untouched. The robbers had left in a hurry, leaving silver items scattered around, and the corpse of one of their number. The tomb had a flattened pyramid rising 12 metres above ground, and a long sloping entrance tunnel lined with frescoes, leading to an ante-chamber and the tomb chamber itself, 12 metres below ground level with a high domed roof. Most of the contents, including the frescoes, are now in the Shaanxi History Museum.

The frescoes depicted the four deities, ceremonial weaponry, daily life in the imperial court, and celestial bodies. The tomb also provides an example of Tang dynasty architecture, with depictions of buildings and caisson motifs. The main subject of the frescoes is women, the majority of whom are shown without make-up and wearing no jewellery. There are also several carved human figures, who seem to be ladies-in-waiting.

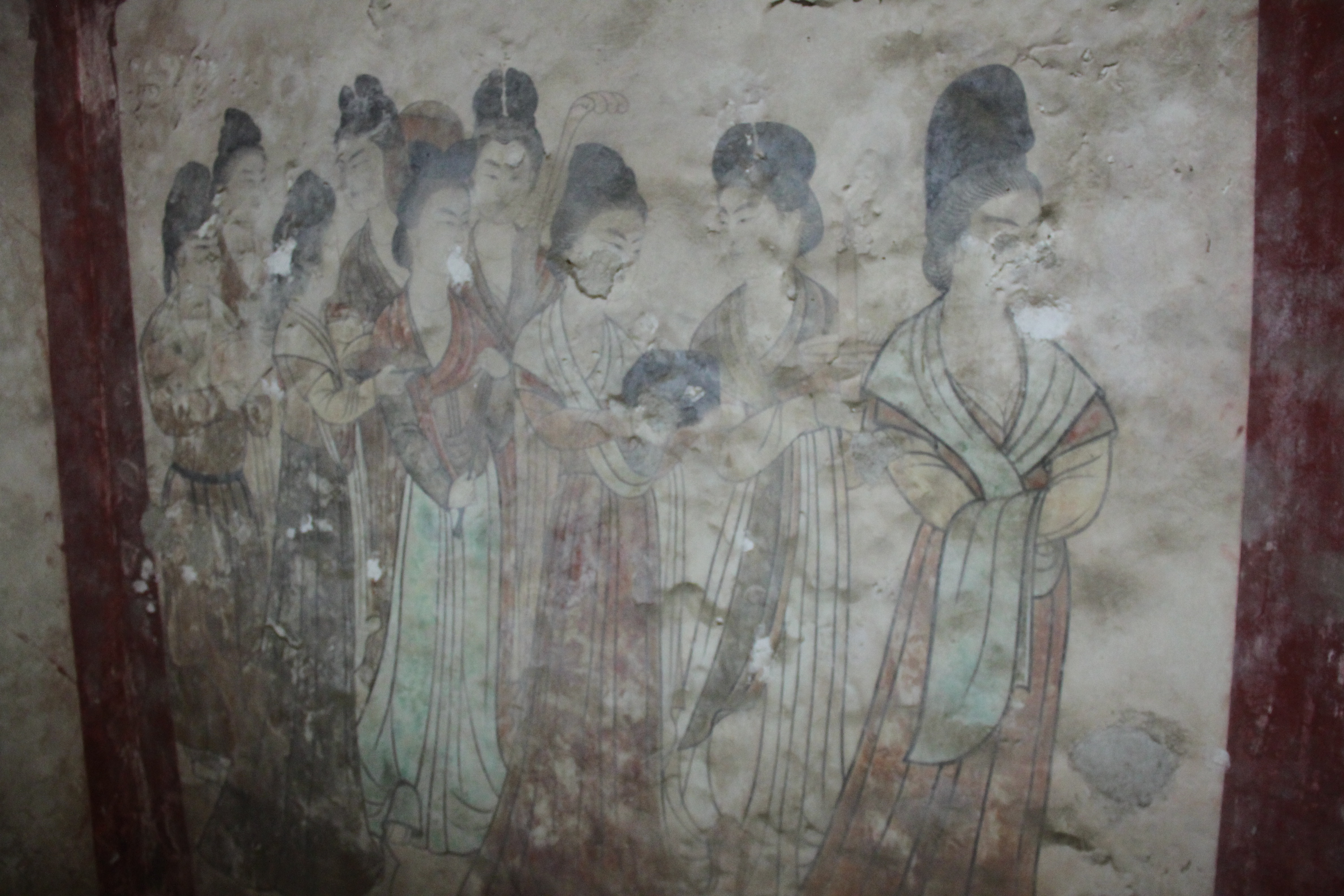
Paintings from the wall of the tomb.

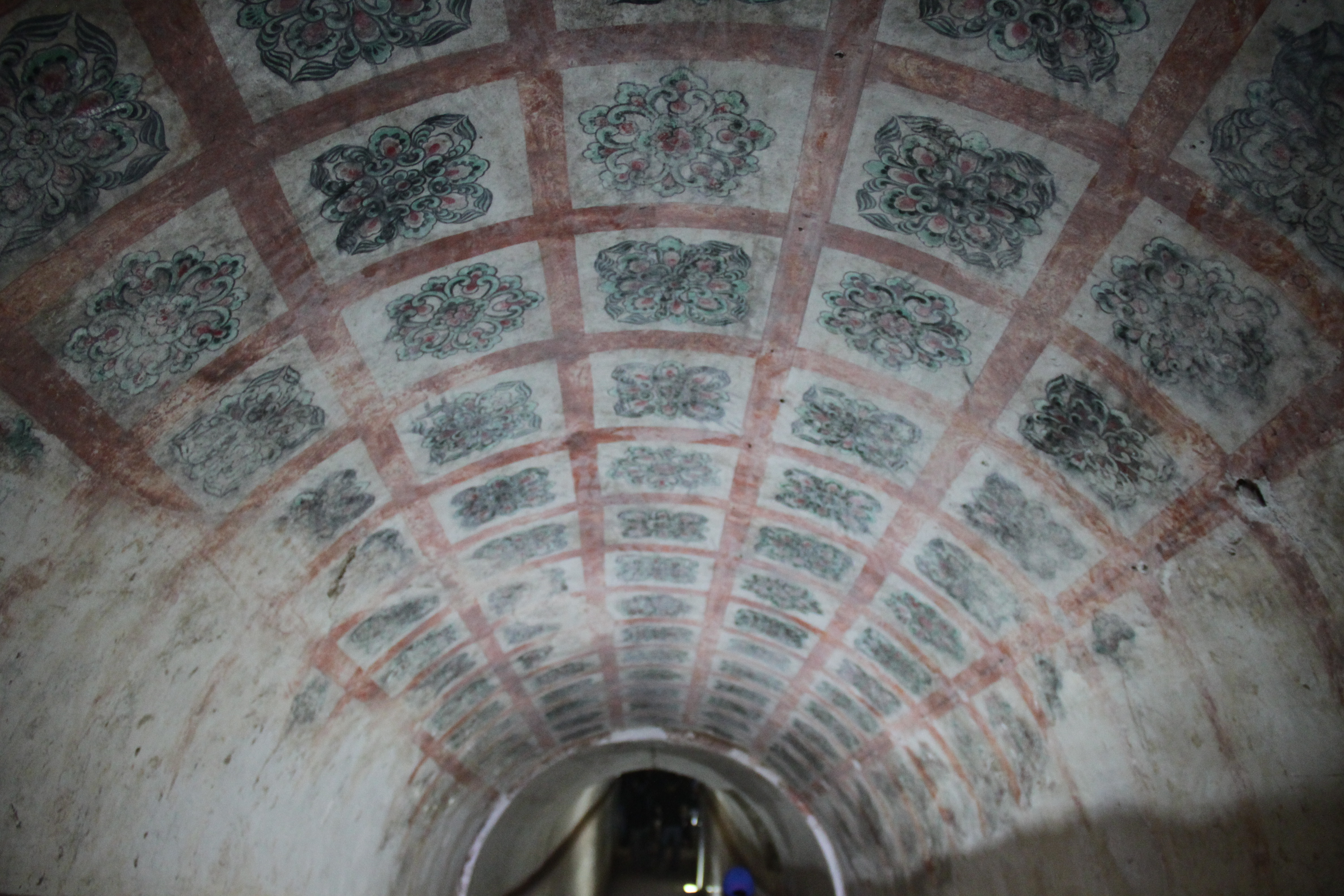
Roof of the tomb.

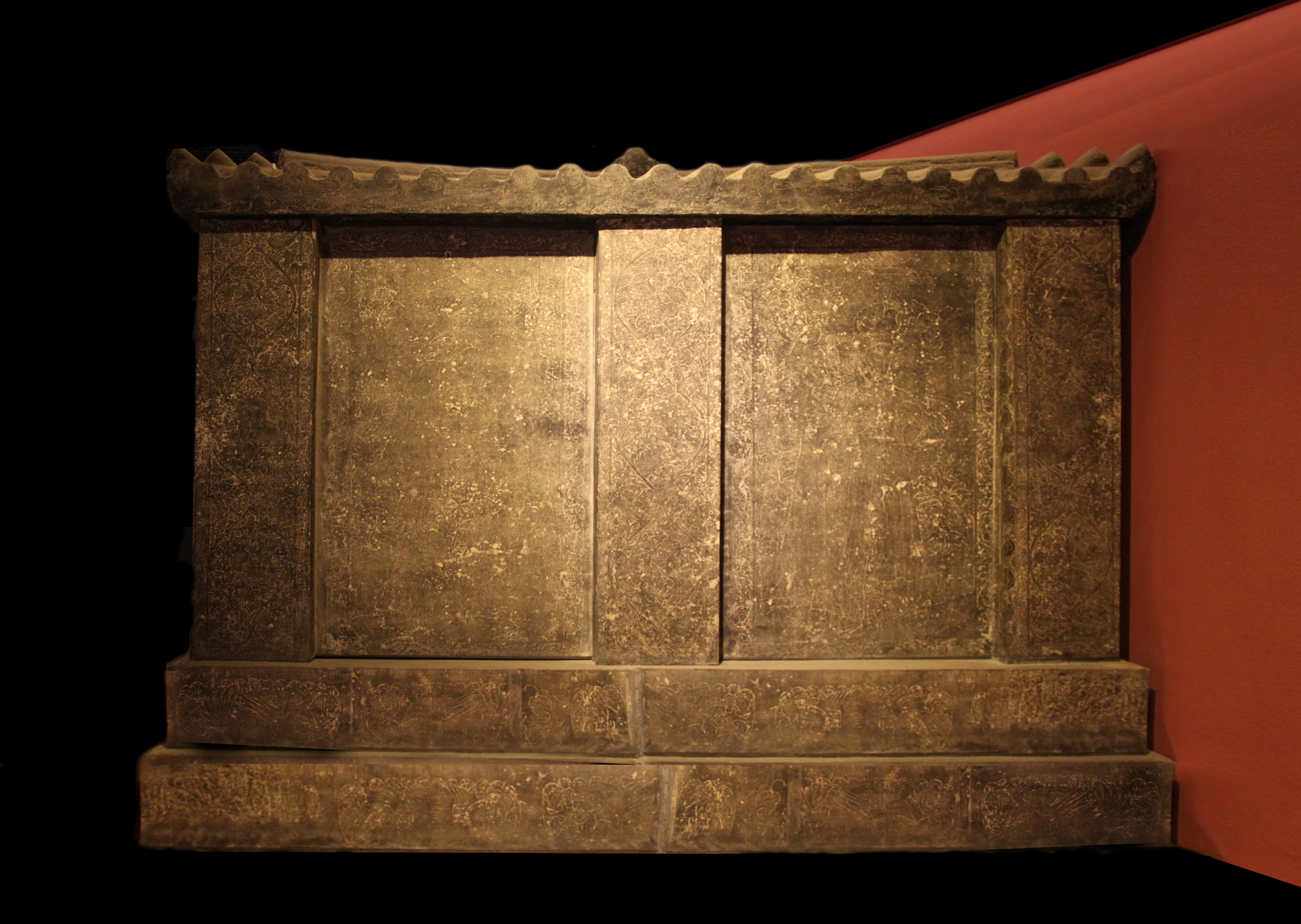
Stone sarcophagus of Princess Yongtai (side view, reproduction), Qianling Museum. Designed as a stone house with hip-and-gable roof, it is comparable to the sarcophagus of Li Jingxun, although much larger with a surface of 40 square meters.

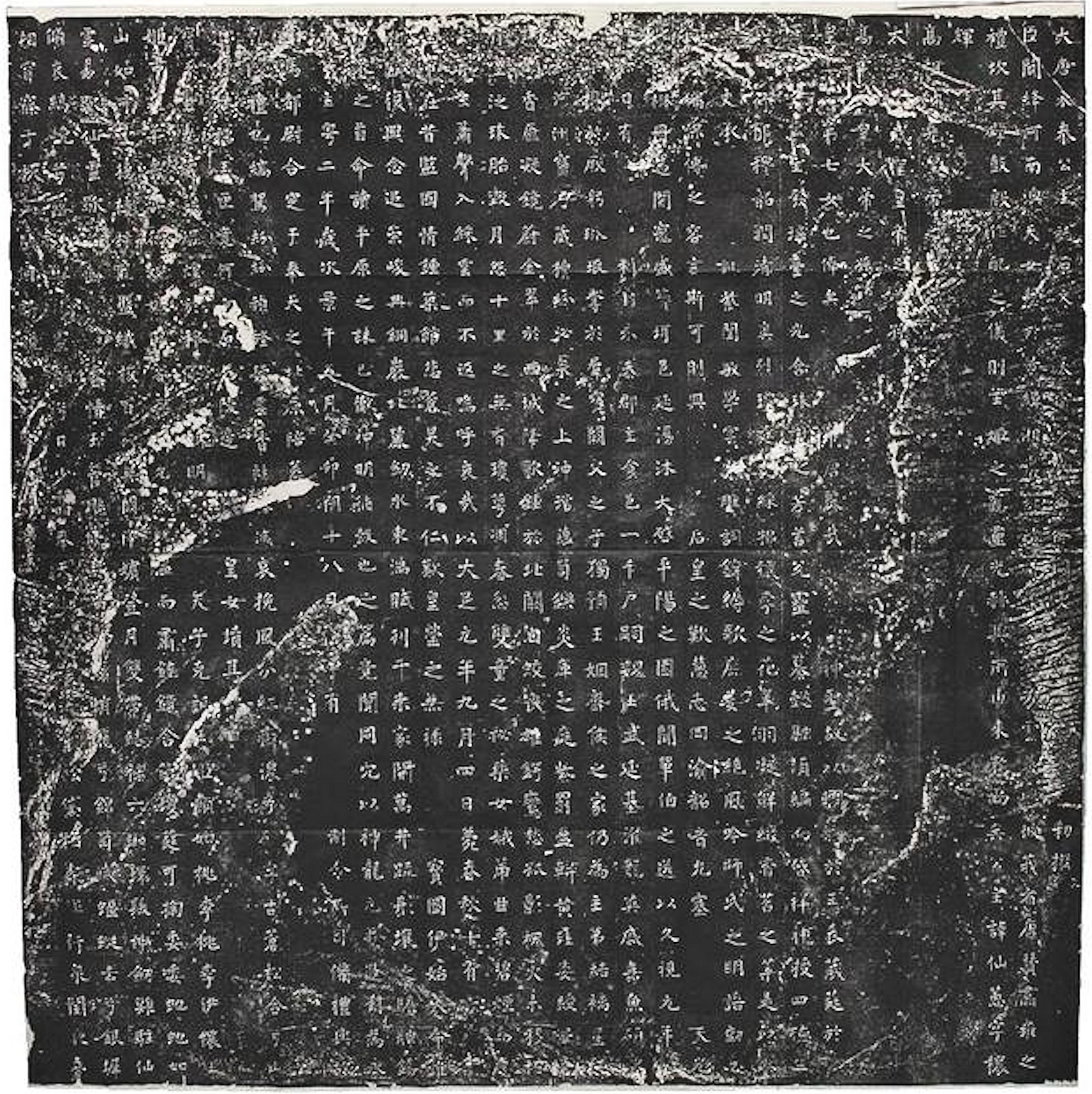
Epitaph of Princess Yongtai (Note: See Da Tang Yongtai Gongzhu Zhi (zh:s:大唐永泰公主誌))

== See also ==
- List of unsolved deaths
