= Herd of Deer =

Painting of deer from Liao Dynasty

- Herd of Deer in Maple Grove

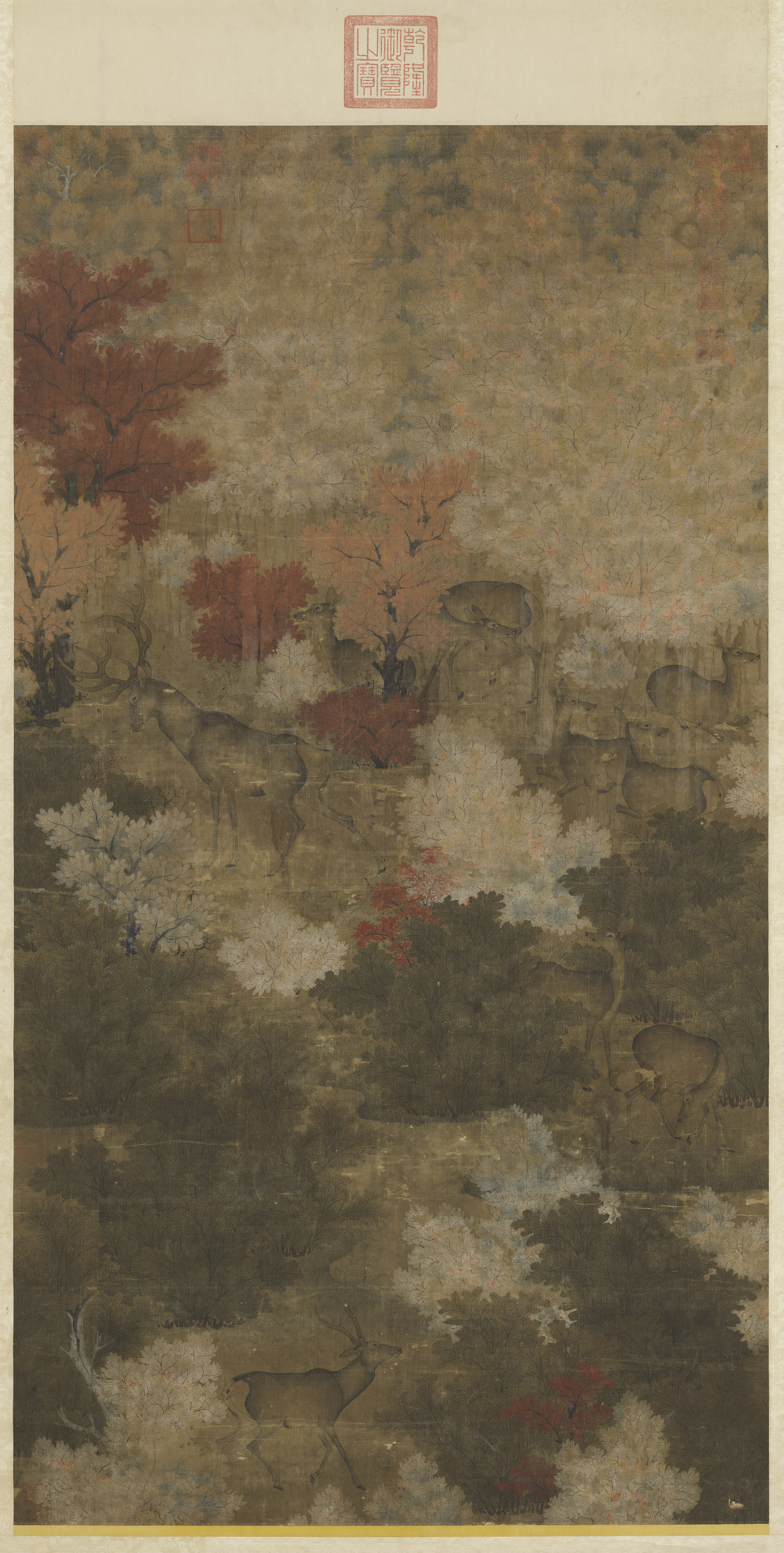
- Herd of Deer in Autumnal Grove
- Material: silk hanging scroll
- Size: Maple Grove: 118.5 x 64.6 cm Autumnal Grove: 118.4 x 63.8 cm
- Created: 10th century
- Present location: National Palace Museum, Taipei, Taiwan
- Registration: Maple Grove: 故畫000032 Autumnal Grove: 故畫000031
- Culture: Liao dynasty

Herd of Deer refers to a set of two Chinese silk hanging scroll paintings that are currently held by the National Palace Museum (NPM) in Taipei, Taiwan: Herd of Deer in a Maple Grove (Chinese: 丹枫呦鹿图; pinyin: Dān fēng yōu lù tú) and Herd of Deer in Autumnal Grove (Chinese: 秋林群鹿圖; pinyin: Qiū lín qún lù tú). Dating to the Five Dynasties and Ten Kingdoms period or the Liao Dynasty, in the 10th century, the paintings depict a herd of deer, a single stag with a bunch of does resting and gathering in a forest in autumn. The artist of the paintings remain unknown, but it is believed to be part of a set or series. Due to their distinctions from typical Chinese painting conventions, and varied colors, they are considered a representative work of Khitan Liao style at the turn of the millennia. The artist of the two paintings remain anonymous.

== Maple Grove ==
Maple Grove, measuring 118.5 x 64.6 cm, depicts the herd in an autumn maple forest. The vegetation is dense, except at the center of the painting, which depicts the herd, with all of the deers' heads facing in one direction, towards the left of the painting, as if they heard a sound in the forest.

The painting utilizes decorative elements and realism using various shadings and textures. In what is called "boneless" style, the painting does not utilize hard outlines and boundaries, but rather a bunch of washes and softer edges as to give dimension, depth and emphasis on the haze and lighting. As such the multiple washes of ink, shadows rendered in blue, and the maple leaves in red, with blends of yellow, ochre, and green, fills the painting with heightened realism. These conventions are distinct from that of the styles of colors of the Han dynasty, and more common depictions of flowers and birds, which scholars believe the Khitan influence derives from.

The painting passed through multiple dynasties of Chinese imperial families, including Wenzong Emperor of Yuan, the Qianlong Emperor, Xianfeng Emperor, and Xuantong, as indicated by the stamped seals placed upon the paintings and are recorded in the Imperial Catalogues of the Sanxitang (Hall of Three Rarities) and the Shiqu Baoji. The foreign conventions of the painting made it appreciated by the Yuan dynasty, and was held by the Kuizhang Pavilion, an art agency established by Wenzong in 1329 (which also had Early Snow on the River, another National Palace Museum owned piece) in its collection. In 2012, the National Palace Museum designated Maple Grove as a National Treasure.

== Autumn Grove ==
Autumn Grove is almost identical in size, measuring 118.4 x 63.8 cm, with the deer painted in light ink wash, with the leaves outlined with fine brushstrokes, down to the veins, before being inlaid with color. More greens are utilized in this painting as to convey lush vitality, and are augmented with washes of mineral white pigment. The ink is not obscured, which also adds a shimmering dynamic. The deer in this version wander about, while others simply stand quietly. It is believed that the artist wanted to convey a scene somewhere in the north, with a blend of maple and white birch. Like Maple Grove, reds, yellows, and light blues are used to convey the diversity of colors in the flora.

During the Song dynasty, in the reign of Emperor Renzong of Song (1022-1063), a text called the Illustrated Records of Painting (圖畫見聞誌, Tuhua jianwen zhi), a prominent history of painting and art catalogue recorded that the Liao presented a painting of a "thousand-horned deer", which the National Palace Museum speculates could be tied to Autumn Grove. Because Autumn Grove and Maple Grove stayed united in ownership over the millennia of its existence, they share the same ownership and catalogue listings based upon the Imperial stamps and collection catalogs.
