= Night-Shining White =

Tang dynasty period painting

- 照夜白圖
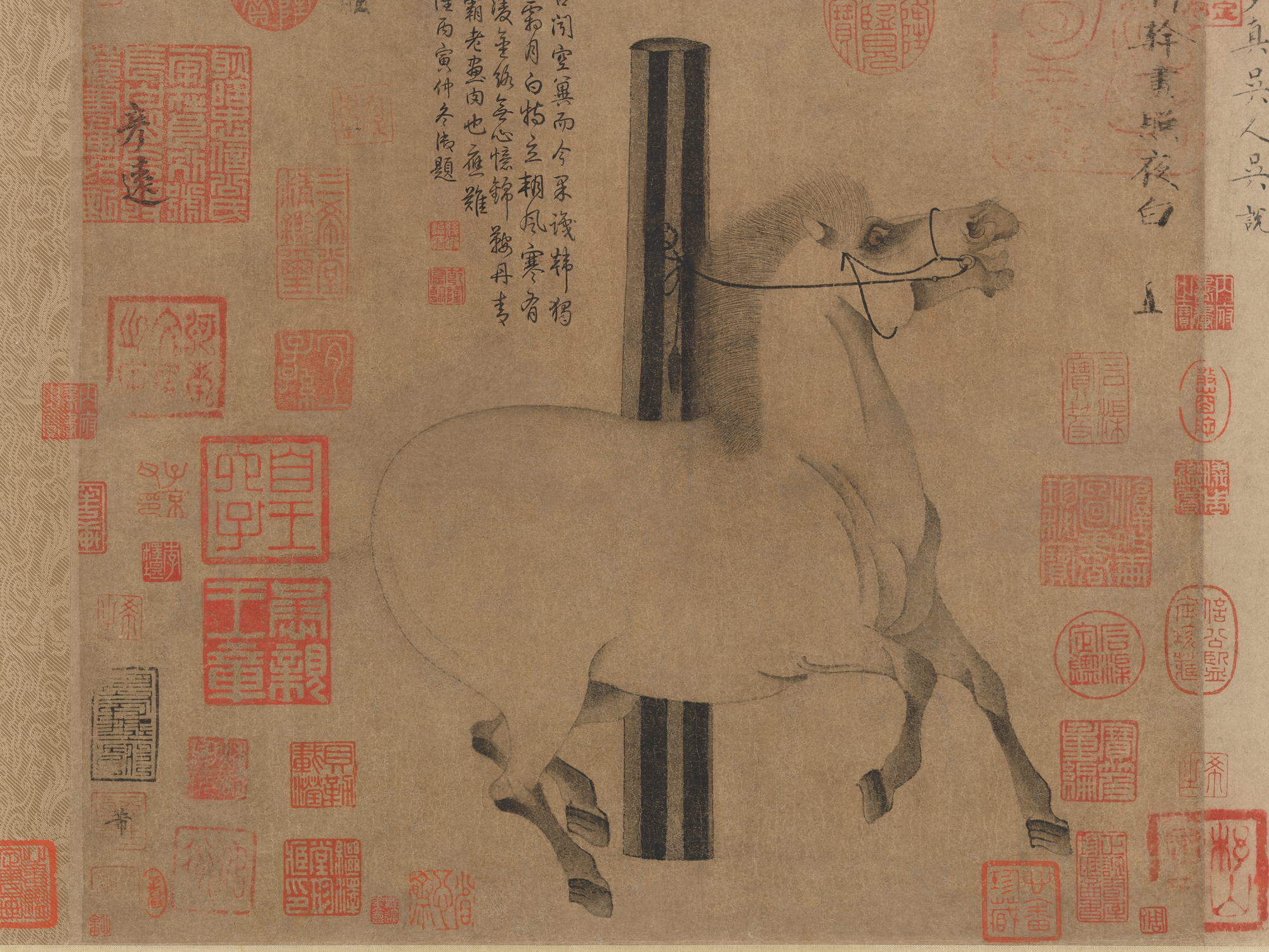
- Artist: Han Gan
- Year: c. 750
- Type: Painting
- Medium: Handscroll; ink on paper
- Dimensions: 30.8 cm × 34 cm (12.1 in × 13 in)
- Location: Metropolitan Museum of Art, New York City

"Night-Shining White" (Chinese: 照夜白圖) is a monochrome ink-on-paper painting by the Chinese artist Han Gan. It is an example of Tang dynasty painting, created in the middle of the 8th century (circa 750). The work depicts a cavalry horse owned by the Emperor Xuanzong (reign 712–56) of the Tang dynasty, tethered to a post. It is considered one of the greatest equine portraits in Chinese painting. It was acquired by the Metropolitan Museum in 1977.

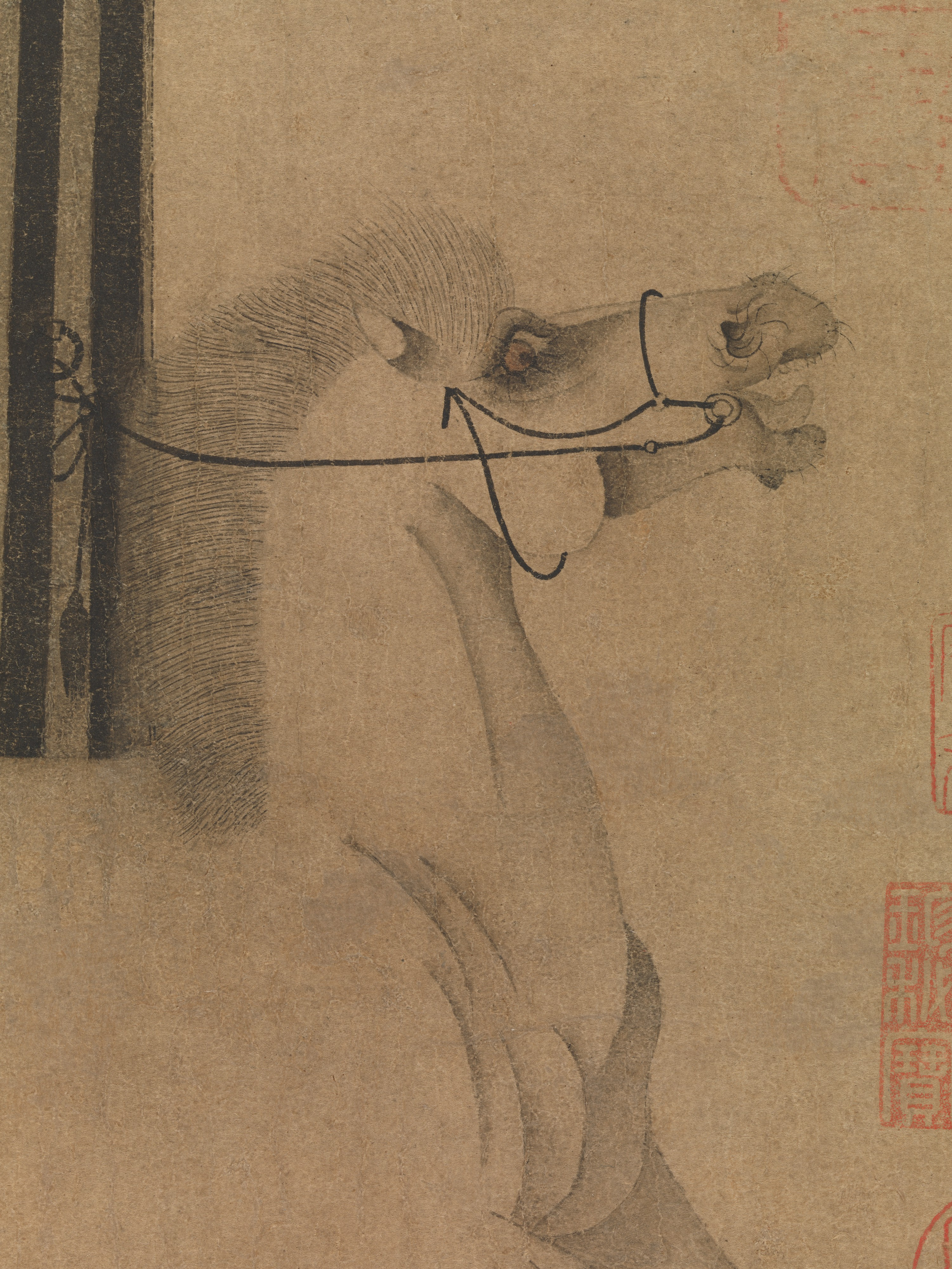
The look of the horse conveys his emotional state.

In his time, Han Gan was considered one of the leading artists of China. Originally from a poor family, Han Gan was working in a wine shop in the capital Chang'an when his artistic talent was spotted by the painter and poet Wang Wei, and he became an artist at the imperial court. He was famous for being able capture the character of a horse as well as its physical appearance. European art historians often note the conventionality of the drawings of Han Gan and other representatives of Chinese painting and see this as a significant difference in Chinese animalistics from works depicting animals created by European artists.

By order of Emperor Xuanzong, Han Gan created a series of "portraits" of famous horses, and this work may originally have been just one of a series of paintings. Many of the original paintings have not survived, but they are known through copies made in subsequent centuries.

The work is an example of bai hua or "white painting", a monochrome work created using a brush and black ink, with economy of line and some simple shading but no colours. The composition is based on earlier works of Chinese art, but despite its limited materials, "Night-Shining White" does not lose its spirituality and restless energy. The painting shows Han Gan's close observation of the subject: in conversation with the Emperor, Han Gan claimed that the horses in the stables were his teachers of painting.

The animals depicted in traditional Chinese painting are usually not as anatomically precise as those found in Western paintings, and "Night-Shining White" is not an entirely realistic portrait. The horse is depicted with characteristic features of the fiery-tempered horse of Chinese mythology, indicative of a dragon in disguise as a celestial steed: large burning eyes, flaring nostrils and dancing hoofs. It proportions are somewhat exaggerated, with short and very thin legs and a very round body. Han Gan gave the horse some human features, with eyes are turned to the viewer that seem to appeal to compassion and help.

The work was later interpreted as an emblem of Chinese military strength and imperial power, but with undertones of peril: Emperor Xuanzong was distracted by his infatuation with a concubine, neglected his duties, and was deposed.

The work is not signed by the artist, but it bear numerous inscriptions, seals and signatures from its subsequent owners—including the seals of the Southern Tang emperor Li Yu, the Song theorist Mi Fu, and the Qianlong Emperor—show that it passed through the hands of many collectors over the following 1,200 years. The original drawing some 12 inches (30 cm) square was later mounted on a 20 feet (6.1 m) long handscroll to provide sufficient space for the seals and inscriptions.

It later came into the collection of Sir Percival David, and was bought by the Metropolitan Museum in 1977, funded by the Dillon Fund.
