= Han Gan =

Chinese painter

Han Gan (simplified Chinese: 韩干; traditional Chinese: 韓幹) (c. 706–783) was a Chinese painter during the Tang dynasty.

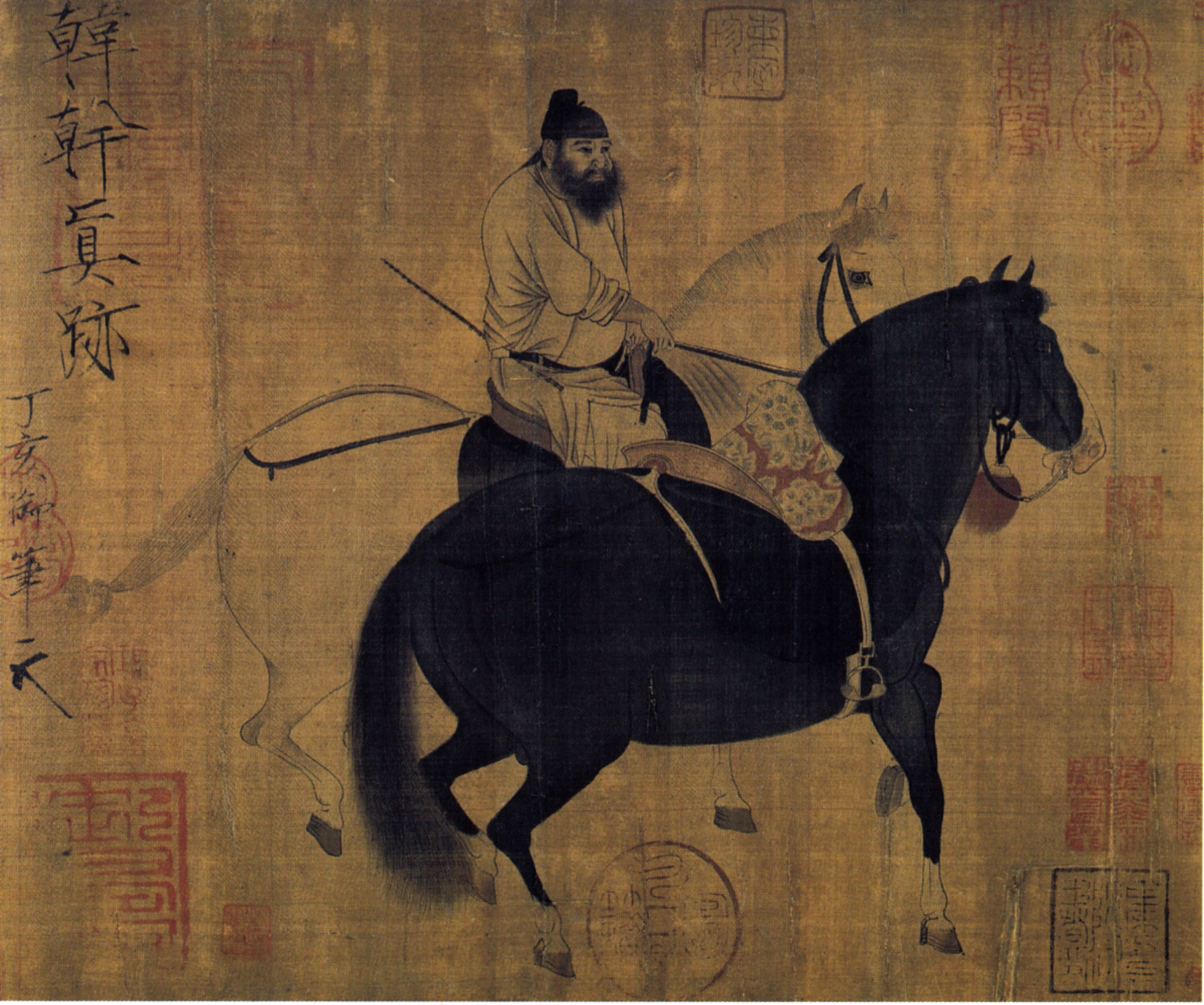
Two horses and a groom

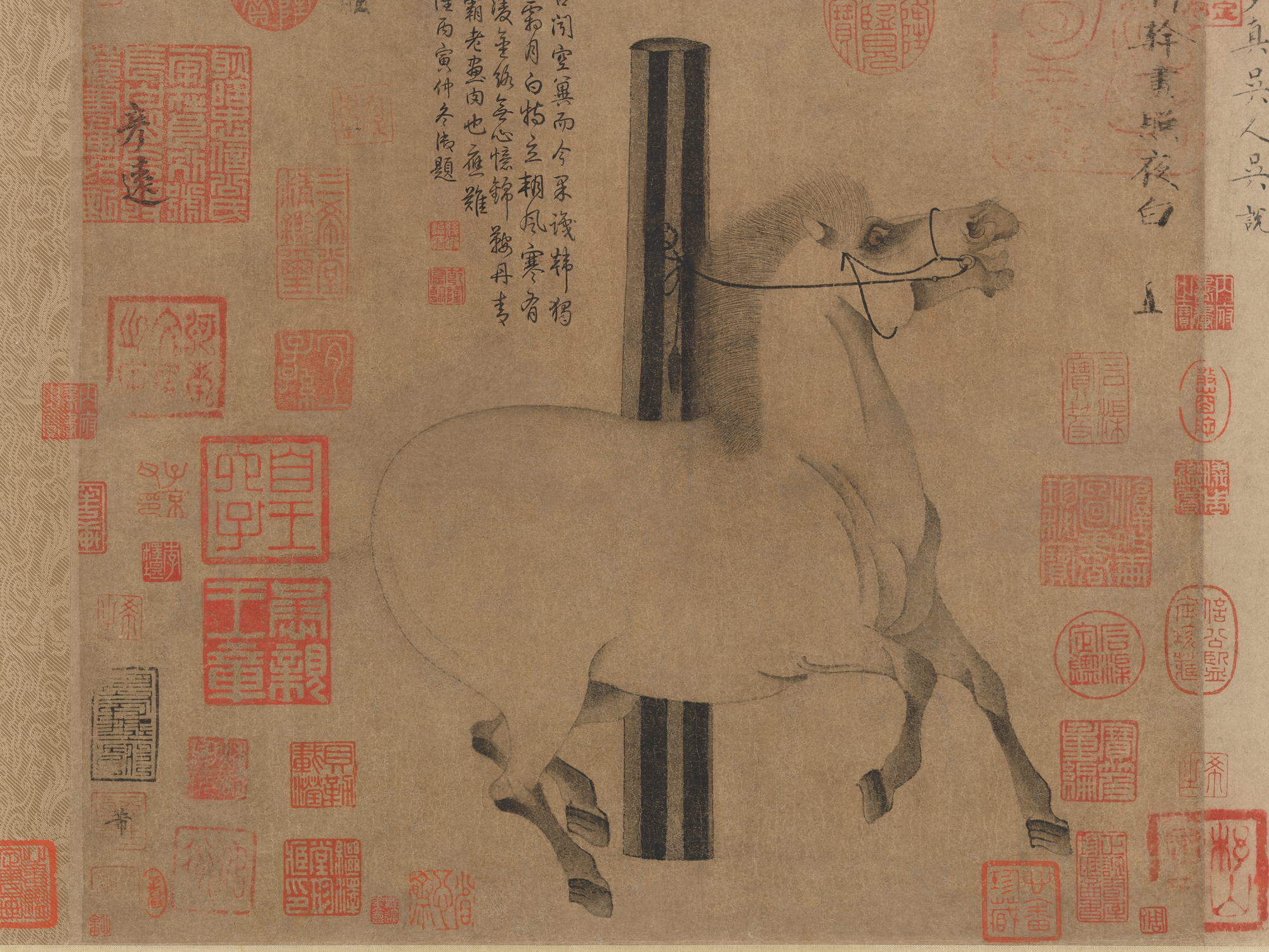
Night-Shining White, portrait of a favorite steed of Emperor Xuanzong

He came from a poor family in either Chang'an, modern-day Xi'an, Shaanxi; Lantian, modern-day Shaanxi; or Daliang, modern-day Kaifeng, Henan. As a young man, Han Gan was recognized by Wang Wei, a prominent poet, who sponsored Han in learning arts. Han became a student of Cao Ba, a court painter. After his studies, Han became a painter in the Tang court.

Han painted many portraits with Buddhist and Daoist themes during his career; however, he is most widely remembered for his paintings of horses. He was reputed to have "learned from the horses in the imperial stables" and to be able to not only portray the physical body of the horse, but also its spirit. His reputation rose and surpassed that of his teacher. Horse painters of later generations studied Han.

The horse as a central subject was continued by Li Gonglin of the Song Dynasty.

He is honored with a crater named for him on Mercury.

== Gallery ==
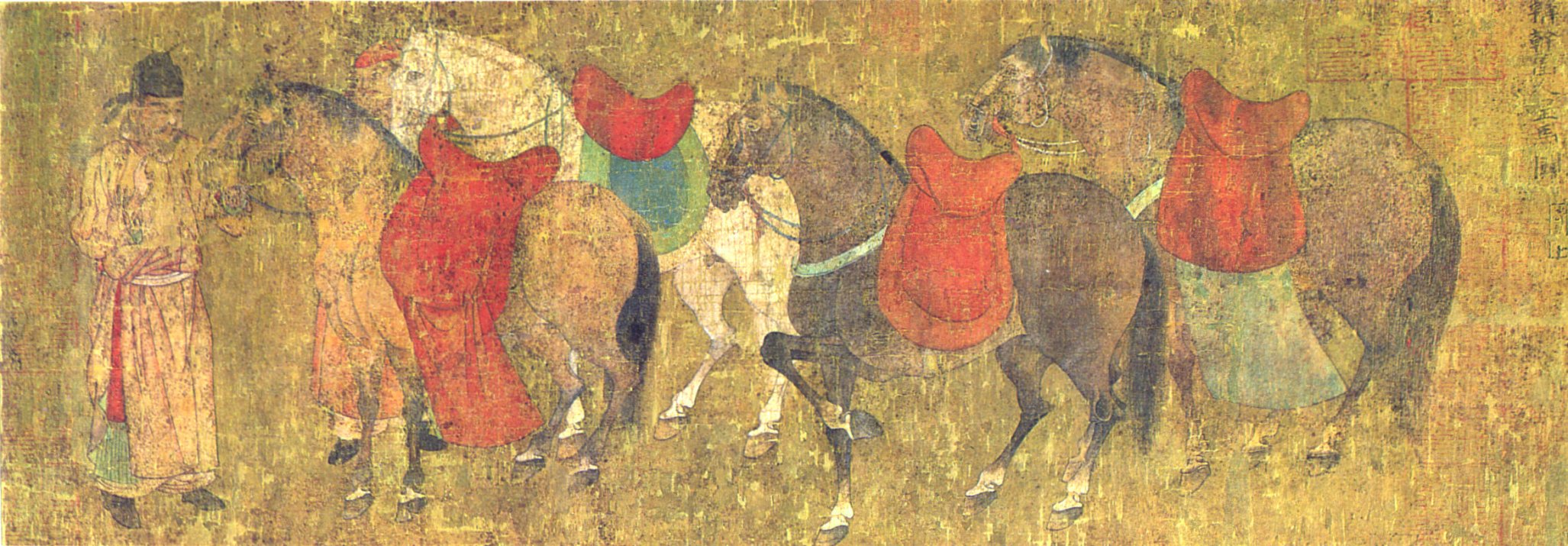

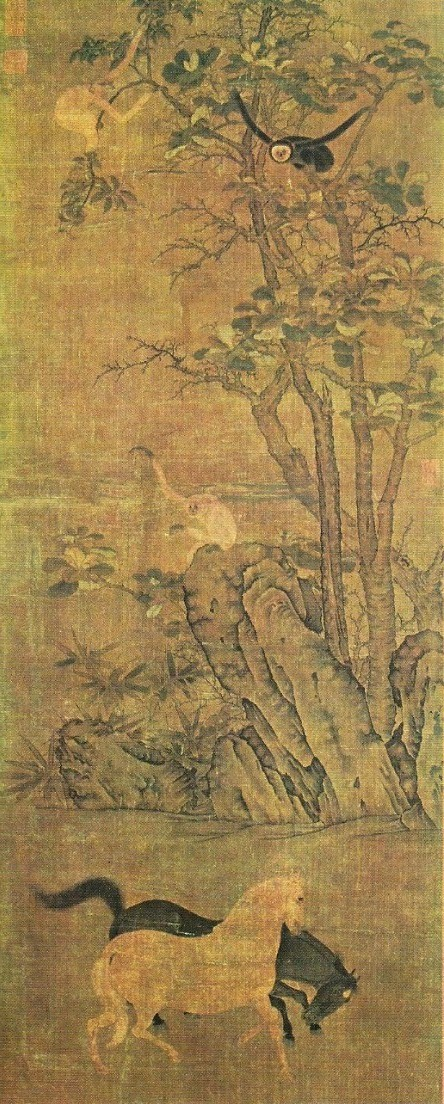
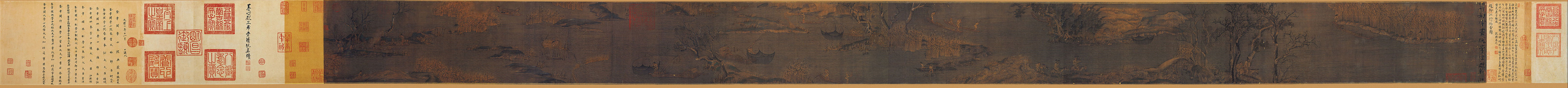
First Snow on the River Banks, original
