= Wu Chengsi =

- Prince Xuan of Wei; Duke of Zhou

Wenchang Zuo Xiang 文昌左相
- Reign: 690–692

Tong Fengge Luantai Sanpin 同鳳閣鸞臺三品
- Reign: 685, 690–692, 697
- Born: 649
- Died: 22 July 698
- Issue: Wu Yanji, Prince of Wei; Wu Yanyi, Prince of Wei; Wu Yanxiu, Prince of Huaiyang
Names
- Family name: Wu 武 Given name: Chengsi 承嗣; Courtesy name: Fengxian 奉先
- Father: Wu Yuanshuang 武元爽

Wu Chengsi (Chinese: 武承嗣; pinyin: Wǔ Chéngsì; 649-July 22, 698), courtesy name Fengxian, formally Prince Xuan of Wei (魏宣王), was a nephew of the Chinese sovereign Wu Zetian and an imperial prince of the Wu Zhou dynasty. He participated in her planning in taking the throne and had wanted to become crown prince after she claimed the throne in 690, but his attempts were repeatedly rebuffed, and after she showed her intent to eventually return the throne to her son Li Zhe by recalling Li Zhe from exile in 698, Wu Chengsi died in disappointment.

== Background ==
It is not known when Wu Chengsi was born. His father Wu Yuanshuang (武元爽) was a half-brother of Wu Zetian—both had, as father, the early Tang dynasty general Wu Shihuo (武士彠), but Wu Yuanshuang and his brother Wu Yuanqing (武元慶) were born of Wu Shihuo's first wife Lady Xiangli, while Wu Zetian and her two sisters were born of Wu Shihuo's second wife Lady Yang. After Wu Zetian became empress to Emperor Gaozong in 655, despite previous intrafamily unpleasantries—Wu Yuanqing and Wu Yuanshuang, as well as Wu Shihuo's nephews Wu Weiliang (武惟良) and Wu Huaiyun (武懷運) were often disrespectful of Lady Yang previously—Empress Wu's brothers and cousins were often promoted by Emperor Gaozong, with Wu Yuanshuang promoted to Shaofu Shaojian (少府少監), the deputy director of the office of palace supplies. However, sometime before 666, Empress Wu, angry that her brothers and cousins did not appreciate the promotions, had them all demoted, with Wu Yuanshuang demoted to be the prefect of Hao Prefecture (濠州, roughly modern Chuzhou, Anhui). Eventually, after further accusations, Wu Yuanshuang was exiled to Zhen Prefecture (振州, roughly modern Sanya, Hainan) and died there in exile. When Wu Yuanshuang was exiled, Wu Chengsi went to Zhen Prefecture with his father.

In 674, Empress Wu had Wu Chengsi recalled from exile to inherit the title of Duke of Zhou—which Emperor Gaozong had posthumously created Wu Shihuo. He was also made the minister of imperial clan affairs.

== During Emperor Zhongzong's and Emperor Ruizong's first reigns ==
Emperor Gaozong died in 683, and was initially succeeded by his and Empress Wu's son Li Zhe the Crown Prince (as Emperor Zhongzong), but Empress Wu retained power as empress dowager and regent. In spring 684, after Emperor Zhongzong showed signs of independence, she deposed him and replaced him with another son, Li Dan the Prince of Yu, but wielded power even more tightly thereafter. Around this time, it appeared that Wu Chengsi became a close confidant of hers, and later that year, when the chancellor Liu Rengui, who was then in charge of the capital Chang'an (with Empress Dowager Wu, who disliked Chang'an and favored the eastern capital Luoyang, taking up permanent residence at Luoyang), offered to resign, it was Wu Chengsi that she sent to Chang'an to comfort Liu and to dissuade him from resigning. It was also Wu Chengsi who formally acted for her at Emperor Ruizong's enthronement. In summer 684, she made Wu Chengsi the minister of rites and gave him the designation Tong Zhongshu Menxia Sanpin (同中書門下三品), making him a chancellor de facto, although she removed him from that position three months later and made him the minister of ceremonies. Later that year, pursuant to a formal request of his, she posthumously created five generations of Wu ancestors princes or dukes and built a five-generation ancestral temple for them, second only to the imperial ancestral temple (which included seven generations). Meanwhile, he and a cousin, Wu Sansi (Wu Yuanqing's son), knowing that Empress Dowager Wu was contemplating taking the throne herself, advocated that two senior members of the Li imperial clan—Emperor Gaozong's uncles Li Yuanjia (李元嘉) the Prince of Han and Li Lingkui (李靈夔) the Prince of Lu—be killed, lest that they interfere with her plans. Empress Dowager Wu agreed, but did not immediately carry out the plan.

In 685, Empress Dowager Wu made Wu Chengsi chancellor again (this time with the modified designation Tong Fengge Luantai Sanpin (同鳳閣鸞臺三品), as she had changed many office names in the government structure) but removed him a month later.

In 686, fearful of the general Li Xiaoyi (李孝逸) -- a member of the imperial Li clan who had defeated the anti-Empress Dowager Wu rebellion led by Li Jingye the Duke of Ying in 684—Wu Chengsi made false accusations against him, and in response, Empress Dowager Wu demoted Li Xiaoyi. In 687, Wu Chengsi further accused Li Xiaoyi of having made comments that he would be emperor one day, and Empress Dowager Wu had Li Xiaoyi exiled to Dan Prefecture (儋州, modern Danzhou, Hainan), where he died in exile.

In 688, Wu Chengsi had the words, "The holy mother is on earth, and the imperial sovereignty will forever be magnified" (聖母臨人永昌帝業) carved onto a rock and then had the rock thrown into the Luo River (洛水, near Luoyang). He then had the commoner Tang Tongtai (唐同泰) "discover" the rock and offer it to Empress Dowager Wu as a sign of divine favor. Empress Dowager Wu was very pleased and claimed herself the honorific title, "Holy Mother, the Divine and August One" (聖母神皇) and set a date to offer sacrifices to the god of Luo River, ordering the commandants, prefects, and nobles to be gathered at Luoyang for the sacrifices. This caused the Li clan imperial princes to be fearful that she was intending to slaughter them, and in response, Emperor Gaozong's brother Li Zhen the Prince of Yue and Li Zhen's son Li Chong the Prince of Langye rose in rebellion against her, but both were quickly defeated; Li Chong was killed in battle, while Li Zhen committed suicide. Empress Wu took this opportunity to have her trusted secret police official Zhou Xing arrest Li Yuanjia, Li Lingkui, Li Yuanjia's son Li Zhuan (李譔) the Duke of Huang, Emperor Gaozong's aunt Princess Changle, and Princess Changle's husband Zhao Gui (趙瓌) and force them to commit suicide. Subsequently, another uncle of Emperor Gaozong, Li Yuangui (李元軌) the Prince of Huo, was exiled, and died on the way to exile; his son Li Xu (李緒) the Prince of Jiangdu and a cousin of Emperor Gaozong's, Li Rong (李融) the Duke off Dongwan, were executed.

In 689, Empress Dowager made Wu Chengsi Nayan (納言) -- the head of examination bureau of government and a post considered one for a chancellor. In 690, she made him Wenchang Zuo Xiang (文昌左相) -- one of the heads of the executive bureau of government, also considered a post for a chancellor. Around the same time, he had Zhou falsely accuse Emperor Gaozong's sons by other consorts, Li Shangjin (李上金) the Prince of Ze and Li Sujie the prince of Xu, of treason. Empress Dowager Wu summoned Li Shangjin and Li Sujie to Luoyang and had Li Sujie strangled; Li Shangjin committed suicide.

Later that year, Emperor Ruizong yielded the throne to Empress Dowager Wu. She took the throne as "emperor" and established her Zhou dynasty, interrupting Tang. She had a number of her Wu relatives created imperial princes, and Wu Chengsi was created the Prince of Wei.

== During Wu Zetian's reign ==
However, what Wu Chengsi wanted to be was crown prince—and emperor in the future. However, Wu Zetian created Li Dan, the former Emperor Ruizong, crown prince (with the unconventional title Huang Si (皇嗣)). Wu Chengsi's ally, the official Zhang Jiafu had the commoner Wang Qingzhi (王慶之) organize a group of petitioners, requesting that Wu Chengsi be made crown prince—under the argument that with an emperor from the Wu clan, it would be inappropriate to have a crown prince from the Li clan. The chancellors Cen Changqian and Ge Fuyuan opposed the movement and advocated that the petitioners be rebuked and disbanded—and their advocacy angered Wu Zetian. Cen and Ge were soon arrested by her secret police official Lai Junchen, and soon, they, as well as another chancellor friendly to them, Ouyang Tong, were executed. For a time, it appeared that Wu Zetian would create Wu Chengsi crown prince, as she often received Wang in audience to hear his advocacy for Wu Chengsi's candidacy; however, later, on an occasion when Wang happened to offend Wu Zetian, the chancellor Li Zhaode, who opposed Wu Chengsi, took the opportunity to have Wang battered to death and his group of petitioners disbanded. He then pointed out to Wu Zetian that Li Dan was her son and closer to her than a nephew. He also pointed out that she had received her power from her husband Emperor Gaozong, whose worship would be swept aside if Wu Chengsi were to become emperor. Wu Zetian agreed with his points and for some time did not speak again of making Wu Chengsi crown prince.

In 692, Lai falsely accused a group of individuals—the chancellors Ren Zhigu, Di Renjie, Pei Xingben, along with the other officials Cui Xuanli (崔宣禮), Lu Xian (盧獻), Wei Yuanzhong, and Li Sizhen (李嗣真) of treason. These officials, in order to avoid torture, confessed to treason—but managed to escape death when Di wrote a secret plea and hid it inside blankets to be smuggled out to his family members, who presented it to Wu Zetian, who then spared them from death but exiled them, despite Lai's and Wu Chengsi's advocacy that they be killed.

Around this time, Li Zhaode secretly suggested to Wu Zetian that Wu Chengsi's powers were becoming too great and would soon rival her own. Wu Zetian agreed, and she gave Wu Chengsi the highly honorific title of Tejin (特進), but removed him from being chancellor. Wu Chengsi subsequently tried to accuse Li Zhaode of crimes, but Wu Zetian did not believe him. Wu Chengsi continued to be honored, however, and around the new year 693, when Wu Zetian offered sacrifices to heaven and earth, she personally offered sacrifices first, and then had Wu Chengsi and Wu Sansi follow her in sacrificing.

In 697, Wu Chengsi became aware that the official Qiao Zhizhi (喬知之) had a beautiful concubine named Biyu (碧玉) -- whom Qiao loved so much that he declined to formally marry a wife. Wu Chengsi invited Biyu to come to his mansion to teach his own concubine arts, and then kept her and would not allow her to go back to Qiao. Qiao wrote a poem entitled the Mourning of Lüzhu (綠珠怨) (Note: Lüzhu was the name of a beautiful concubine of the Jin dynasty (266–420) official Shi Chong, who offended the powerful official Sun Xiu (a close associate of Sima Lun) by refusing to give Lüzhu to Sun. Subsequently, when Sun was set to arrest and execute Shi on false accusation of treason, Lüzhu committed suicide.) and sent it to Biyu. When Biyu read it, she was so distressed that she committed suicide by jumping into a well. When Wu Chengsi found this poem on her, he had secret police officials falsely accuse Qiao of crimes, and Qiao was killed. Later that year, Wu Chengsi was again made chancellor, but less than a month later, he was again removed.

By 698, Wu Chengsi and Wu Sansi were both again making designs on becoming crown prince, and they often had people tell Wu Zetian, "Throughout the ages, no emperor has ever made a person of a different clan crown prince." She hesitated. However, Di, who by this point had been recalled and was again chancellor, constantly advocated for Wu Zetian's sons, including advising her to recall Li Zhe, the former Emperor Zhongzong, from exile. With the other chancellors Wang Fangqing and Wang Jishan, as well as Wu Zetian's close advisor Ji Xu and her lovers Zhang Yizhi and Zhang Changzong advocating the same, Li Zhe was recalled from exile. Wu Chengsi, seeing his chances of being crown prince slipping away, died later that year in distress.

== Issue ==
Wu Chengsi was succeeded by his eldest son Wu Yanji (武延基) who had married Princess Yongtai daughter of Emperor Zhongzong. In 701, Wu Yanji was accused of privately discussing the Zhangs and his execution ordered along with that of his brother-in-law Li Chongrun, Prince of Shao and eldest son of Emperor Zhongzong. Whether or not his wife Princess Yongtai was also executed at this time is debated but she nonetheless died around the same time. The second son Wu Yanyi (武延義) succeeded as the new Prince of Wei whilst the youngest son Wu Yanxiu (武延秀) was created Prince of Huaiyang.

== In popular culture ==
- Portrayed by Jeon Hyeon in the 2006-2007 KBS TV series Dae Jo-yeong.
- Portrayed by Wayne Lai in The Greatness of a Hero (2009).
- Portrayed by Guo Qiang in Heroes of Sui and Tang Dynasties 5 (2015).
