= Hou Sizhi =

Chinese secret police official (died 693)

Hou Sizhi (侯思止) (died 693) was a secret police official during the Chinese Tang dynasty and Wu Zetian's Zhou dynasty.

== Early life ==
Hou Sizhi was from Tang's capital prefecture Yong Prefecture (雍州, roughly modern Xi'an, Shaanxi). He was said to be poor and unable to make a living selling bread. He was a servant at the household of General Gao Yuanli (高元禮) in Heng Prefecture (later Shijiazhuang, Hebei). In 690, he was accused of inappropriate conduct. The prefect, Pei Zhen, was set to sentence him to caning. A local official advised Hou to make a secret report to Wu Zetian, then empress dowager and regent over her son, Emperor Ruizong. He did so, accusing Pei and Emperor Ruizong's granduncle Li Yuanming (李元名), the Prince of Shu, of plotting treason together.

== Censor ==
Empress Dowager Wu, already looking for excuses to act against senior members of the Li imperial clan, exiled Li Yuanming and executed Pei and Li Yuanming's son Li Dan (李亶) the Prince of Yuzhang. She gave Hou the title of General, but Hou offered to become an assistant censor, which was ranked lower but which had the authority to investigate crimes. Wu asked him, "You are illiterate. How can you be a censor?" Hou responded, "A xiezhi is also illiterate, but it could use its horn to hit the evil!" (The xiezhi was a mythical one-horned animal that was intelligent, and whenever it saw two people fighting, it would use its horn to hit the wrong side.) The Dowager was pleased and made him a censor. On one occasion, she was set to award a house to Hou that was seized from a person accused of treason. Hou declined and stated, "I hate treasonous individuals, and I do not want a house from one!" She was further impressed.

In 692 (Wu had by then established her own Zhou dynasty), multiple officials—the chancellors Ren Zhigu, Di Renjie, and Pei Xingben, along with Pei Xuanli (裴宣禮), Lu Xian (盧獻), Wei Yuanzhong, and Li Sizhen (李嗣真) -- were accused of treason. The secret police official Lai Junchen was in charge of the investigations, but was specifically charged with interrogating Wei. Wei refused to admit to treason, so Hou had him dragged on the ground feet-first. Wei sarcastically stated, "I am so unlucky that it is like having fallen from a donkey with my feet stuck to the stirrup, and being dragged by the beast." Hou, in anger, increased the speed of the dragging, and Wei responded, "Hou Sizhi, if you want my head, just cut it off. Do not ask me to admit treason." He further criticized Hou for using vulgar speech unfit for an imperial official—which caused Hou to stop the torture and thank him for teaching him to speak properly. (Ultimately, the officials were merely exiled.)

Hou, however, continued to be known for his vulgar speech, which other officials often joked about. When censor Huo Xianke (霍獻可) once laughed about Hou's speech, Hou, in anger, reported it to Wu. Wu rebuked Huo for laughing about one of her trusted officials—but when Huo then informed Wu of his vulgarities, she laughed as well.

== Death ==
Hou, seeing that Lai had divorced one wife and forced the daughter of Wang Qingshen (王慶詵), of a prominent clan, to marry him, also wanted to marry into a prominent clan. He picked the daughter of Li Ziyi (李自挹), This matter was discussed by the chancellors. Chancellor Li Zhaode thought this to be inappropriate and vowed to act against Hou. After Wu Zetian decreed in 693 that no one was to use silk, Hou was accused of improperly using silk, and Li Zhaode investigated the case. He took this opportunity to have Hou battered to death.
