= List of prisons in Anhui =

This is a list of prisons within Anhui province of the People's Republic of China.

Name	Enterprise name	City/County/District	Village/Town	Established	Notes
Anqing Prison	Anqing Wanjiang Color Weaving Factory, An'qing Wangong Machine Tool Factory, Anqing Prison No. 2 LRC	Daguan	Guanyuemiao	1906	Oldest prison still in use in province. Houses serious offenders. Prison enterprise Anqing Wanjiang Color Weaving Company includes a colored woven cloth factory, garment factory, machinery factory, and Qingfeng Plastics Factory. Mainly does machinery processing and garment processing.
Baihu Prison	Baihu Farm	Chaohu	Lujiang County	1953	Second largest prison in China and largest prison in the province.
Bengbu Prison	Bengbu Rubber Works	Bengbu		1958	Houses severe criminals. Prison enterprise mainly deals with the processing and production of rubber hoses.
Chaohu Prison	Anhui Provincial Chaohu Casting Factory Ltd.	Chaohu		1959	Third largest prison in the province. Houses thousands of serious offenders, most of whom are sentencing to life or serving commuted death sentences. Factory est. 1959, a national large-sized enterprise and a national key enterprise in the machinery industry, as well as a specialized enterprise designated by the Ministry of Railways to produce railway parts. Products are used in all railway engineering departments throughout China.
Chuxian Prison		Chuxian County			unconfirmed information
Fanchang Prison	Sanshan Coal Mine				unconfirmed information
Fuyang Prison	Fuyang Machine Works Tongli Ltd.	Fuyang		1971	Mid-size enterprise working in a variety of industries including fabric manufacturing, machine processing, and clothing manufacturing.
Guzhen Prison	Guzhen Engineering Department				unconfirmed information
Hefei Prison	Jianghuai Automobile Factory	Hefei		1954	For serious offenders
Huainan Prison	Huainan Coal Mine	Huainan			unconfirmed information
Huaiyuan Prison	Xi'nanhuai Coal Mine				unconfirmed information
Jiucheng Administration Branch	Jiucheng Processing Plant, Jiucheng Brickyard Plant, Jiucheng Ink Factory, Jiucheng Machine Works, Jiucheng Waterworks	Wangjiang County, Anqing		1957	Produces a variety of goods such as clothing, wool sweaters, and did silver paper processing.
Jiulong Prison		Yingzhou District, Fuyang	Jiulong		120 acres (0.49 km^{2})
Lujiang Prison	Anhui Prov. Baihu Valve Factory	Chaohu	Baihu Town, Lujiang County	1957	One of the largest national valve manufacturers.
Ma'anshan Prison	Magang Julong Company	Ma'anshan	Suoku, Xiangshan Town, Yushan District	1964	
Provincial Juvenile Offender Detachment					Western Suburbs of Hefei
Provincial No. 1 Prison	Xinsheng Cotton Mill				Suburbs of Hefei
Provincial No. 2 Prison	Fuyang Xinsheng Cotton Mill	Fuyang County			Contains some female prisoners. Produces various kinds of cotton textiles. Includes Wanjiang Machine Tool Works where 300 prisoners produce grinding machines.
Provincial No. 6 Prison	Chuzhou				
Qingliu Prison		Chuzhou			House inmates sentenced to less than 5 years.
Qingshan Prison		Chaohu	Lujiang County	1972	Formerly known as Baihu Farm
Shushan Prison	Hefei Automobile Forging Ltd.	Hefei		1955	
Si County Prison	Si County Farm	Si County			
Suzhou Prison	Suzhou Prison Plastic & Steel Door & Window Factory; Huateng Garment Dyeing Ltd.	Suzhou	Si County		Primarily houses serious male offenders but began housing female prisoners in 1969. Is Anhui's largest producer of colored cloth.
Taihe Prison		Taihe County			Unconfirmed information
Tianchang Prison	Tianchang Farm				
Tongling Prison	Cement Factory	Tongling			Has prisoners since 1998
Wuhu Prison	Xinsheng Cotton Mill	Wuhu		1905	also produces metal parts
Xiuning Prison					closed
Xuancheng Prison	Nanhu Farm				unconfirmed information
Yicheng Prison	Shangzhangwei Farm	Hefei	Yicheng Town, Baohe District		Mainly cultivates vegetables and rice but also produces soccer training shoes, soccer balls, tourism souvenirs, and other products.
