= List of cities in the Yangtze Delta =

City	Hanzi	Hanyu Pinyin	Wu	Regional population (2010)	Urban population (2010)	GDP (2011, billion yuan)	Image
Shanghai	上海	Shànghǎi	Zaonhe	23,019,148	12,286,274	1,919.57	
Nanjing (Jiangsu)	南京	Nánjīng	Noecin (Note: The dialects in these areas are generally not Wu Chinese.)	8,004,680	6,852,984	614.55	
Hangzhou (Zhejiang)	杭州	Hángzhōu	Ghaontseu	8,700,400	3,075,212	701.18	
Suzhou (Jiangsu)	苏州 蘇州	Sūzhōu	Soutseu	10,465,994	2,424,759	1,071.70	
Ningbo (Jiangsu)	宁波 寧波	Níngbō	Nyinpou	7,605,689	1,364,963	601.05	
Wuxi (Jiangsu)	无锡 無錫	Wúxī	Vusih	6,372,624	2,252,571	688.02	
Changzhou (Jiangsu)	常州	Chángzhōu	Zantseu	4,591,972	1,219,557	358.04	
Nantong (Jiangsu)	南通	Nántōng	Noethon	7,282,835	1,361,003	408.02	
Shaoxing (Zhejiang)	绍兴 紹興	Shàoxīng	Zaushin	4,912,200	481,720	329.12	
Jinhua (Zhejiang)	金华 金華	Jīnhuá	Cinho	4,614,100	321,632	244.77	
Jiaxing (Zhejiang)	嘉兴 嘉興	Jiāxīng	Ciashin	4,501,700	428,609	266.81	
Taizhou (Zhejiang)	台州	Tāizhōu	Thetseu	5,968,800	310,464	279.49	
Yangzhou (Jiangsu)	扬州 揚州	Yángzhōu	Ghiantseu	4,459,760	1,705,209	263.03	
Yancheng (Jiangsu)	盐城 鹽城	Yánchéng	Ghiezen	7,260,240	892,874	277.13	
Taizhou (Jiangsu)	泰州	Tàizhōu	Thatseu	4,618,558	551,730	242.26	
Zhenjiang (Jiangsu)	镇江 鎮江	Zhènjiāng	Tsenkaon	3,113,384	671,808	231.04	
Huzhou (Zhejiang)	湖州	Húzhōu	Ghoutseu	2,893,500	443,102	151.88	
Huai'an (Jiangsu)	淮安	Huái'ān	Ghuaoe	4,799,889	1,133,946	169.00	
Zhoushan (Zhejiang)	舟山	Zhōushān	Tseuse	1,121,300	281,423	76.53	
Quzhou (Zhejiang)	衢州	Qúzhōu	Jiutseu	2,456,100	275,973	89.03	
Ma'anshan (Anhui)	马鞍山 馬鞍山	Mǎ'ānshān	Mooese	1,366,302	532,410	114.42	
Hefei (Anhui)	合肥	Héféi	Ghehvi	7,457,466 (Note: including Chaohu City and Lujiang County)	1,783,612	363.66	

_{Note:}
