= Baihu Prison =

Prison in Anhui, China

Baihu Prison is a prison in Lujiang County, Anhui, China. It was established in 1953. Originally the Anhui Prov. No. 1 LGB. The prison is a particularly large-sized agriculture prison built on land reclaimed from a lake. The total area the prison covers is 162 square kilometres (63 sq mi), 130,000 mu of cultivated land and 8,000 mu of water area. It holds roughly 18,000 prisoners yearly making it China's second largest prison and Anhui Province's largest prison. GEOINT analysis puts the prison centre of mass as located at 31.241276°N, 117.458221°E, but there are a number of separately secured facilities all with high security measures visible on Google Earth.

== See also ==
- List of prisons in Anhui
