= Zhang Jiafu =

Zhang Jiafu (張嘉福) (died July 25, 710) was a Chinese politician of the Tang dynasty and Wu Zetian's Zhou dynasty, briefly serving as chancellor during the reign of Emperor Shang.

Despite Zhang's high status, little is firmly established about his career except for the time that he served as chancellor—as, unusual for a chancellor, he did not have a biography in either the Old Book of Tang or the New Book of Tang. He was not even included among the chancellors of the Zhang clan in the table of the chancellors' family trees in the New Book of Tang.

As of 691, during Wu Zetian's reign, Zhang Jiafu was serving as Fengge Sheren (鳳閣舍人), a mid-level official at the legislative bureau of government (鳳閣, Fengge), when he was involved in instigating a petition drive led by Wang Qingzhi (王慶之) to persuade Wu Zetian to make her nephew Wu Chengsi the Prince of Wei crown prince to displace her son Li Dan, who was emperor from 684 to 690 until Wu Zetian took the throne herself. The petition drive initially got Wu Zetian's attention, and the chancellors Cen Changqian and Ge Fuyuan were executed for vehemently opposing it. However, she never made Wu Chengsi crown prince, and after Wang was killed by the official Li Zhaode later in the year, the petition drive dissipated.

Zhang's activities for the next two decades are lost to history. As of 710, another son of Wu Zetian's, Li Xian, was emperor (as Emperor Zhongzong). That year, however, Emperor Zhongzong died suddenly—a death that traditional historians believed to be a poisoning carried out by Emperor Zhongzong's wife Empress Wei and daughter Li Guo'er the Princess Anle, so that Empress Wei could become "emperor" like Wu Zetian, and Princess Anle could become crown princess. Empress Wei did not immediately announce Emperor Zhongzong's death, and she carried out a number of moves intended to consolidate her power over the government. As a part of these moves, Zhang, who was then the minister of civil service affairs (吏部尚書, Libu Shangshu), was given the designation Tong Zhongshu Menxia Pingzhangshi (同中書門下平章事), making him a chancellor de facto. Soon, Emperor Zhongzong's son by a concubine, Li Chongmao the Prince of Wen, was named emperor (as Emperor Shang), but Empress Wei retained power as empress dowager and regent. She sent a number of her associates to survey the circuits to make sure that no one would dare rise against her, and Zhang was sent to survey Hebei Circuit (河北道, roughly modern Hebei, Beijing, and Tianjin). After Zhang left the capital Chang'an, a coup led by Emperor Zhongzong's sister Princess Taiping and nephew Li Longji the Prince of Linzi killed Empress Wei and Li Guo'er, along with a number of their associates. At that time, Zhang had reached Huai Prefecture (懷州, roughly modern Jiaozuo, Henan), and was arrested and executed.

== Notes and references ==
- Zizhi Tongjian, vols. 204, 209.
