= Lai Junchen =

Chinese politician and writer

Lai Junchen (Chinese: 來俊臣) (died 26 June 697) was a Chinese politician and writer. He was a well-known secret police official during the Chinese Tang and Wu Zhou dynasties, whose ability to interrogate and falsely implicate officials of crimes made him a subject of fear and hatred. In 697, he was accused of plotting to falsely accuse Wu Zetian's sons and other family members of treason, and he was executed.

== Background ==
It is not known when Lai Junchen was born, but it is known that he was from Wannian County (萬年), one of the two counties making up the Tang dynasty capital Chang'an. His father was one Lai Cao (來操) -- who was said to have won Lai Junchen's mother, then the wife of his friend Cai Ben (蔡本), after winning in gambling with Cai. Lai Junchen was said to be a thug who did not work, who was investigated for thievery while he was at He Prefecture (和州, roughly modern Chaohu, Anhui) and who then made false accusations against others to the prefect, Li Xu (李續) the Prince of Dongping, a cousin of then-reigning Emperor Ruizong. Li Xu had him caned 100 times and thrown out.

In 689, in the aftermath of rebellions against Emperor Ruizong's mother and regent Empress Dowager Wu (later known as Wu Zetian) by Emperor Ruizong's uncle Li Zhen the Prince of Yue and Li Chong the Prince of Langye, Li Xu, along with many other imperial Li clan members, was executed by Empress Dowager Wu. Lai again made a secret report, this time directly to Empress Dowager Wu, who encouraged such reports from anyone. When she met with him, he claimed that what he was reporting earlier dealt with Li Zhen's and Li Chong's rebellions, and that Li Xu had improperly suppressed them. Empress Dowager Wu believed him and thought he was faithful to her, and therefore made him a secret police official, rising to the rank of deputy imperial censor (御史中丞, Yushi Zhongcheng).

== First stint as secret police official ==
It was said that Lai Junchen personally retained a staff of several hundred men who were previously thugs, with the intent to have them make reports. If he decided to falsely implicate someone in a crime, then he had the men submit false reports that corroborate each other. Lai and his assistant Wan Guojun (萬國俊) even authored a text known as the Classic of Accusation (羅織經), teaching their subordinates how to accuse people of crimes and how to create details that make the alleged plot appear logical and likely. Lai and the other secret police officials were also said to have created a number of torture methods and equipments to get the accused to confess, and further, each time he knew that a general pardon was set to be issued, he had the jailers kill important prisoners first before the general pardon would be declared. Lai's authorities continued to grow, particularly after Empress Dowager Wu herself took the throne in 690 as "emperor" of a new Zhou dynasty, interrupting Tang and reducing Emperor Ruizong to the rank of crown prince.

In 691, the official Liu Xinggan (劉行感) was accused of treason. Wu Zetian had the chancellor Shi Wuzi investigate along with Lai. After Liu Xinggan and his brothers were executed for treason, Lai further reported to Wu Zetian that Shi had good relations with Liu Xinggan and had tried to hide evidence of Liu Xinggan's guilt. Wu Zetian had Lai investigate Shi as well and Shi, in fear, committed suicide.

That year, a famous incident involving Lai and fellow secret police official Zhou Xing occurred. Earlier that year, the general Qiu Shenji (丘神勣) had been accused of crime and executed, and subsequently, there were secret reports that Zhou was involved with Qiu's crimes. Wu Zetian had Lai investigate, without Zhou's knowledge. One day, Lai and Zhou sat down to lunch, and Lai asked Zhou the question of, "Many of the accused are not willing to confess. Do you have an idea on how to get them to confess?" Zhou responded, "That is easy. Take a big urn and set a fire under it. Put the accused in it, and surely he will confess everything." Lai had a big urn brought and a fire set underneath, in accordance with Zhou's instructions, and then rose and stated to Zhou, "I had received secret instructions from Her Imperial Majesty with regard to you, my brother. Please enter the urn." Zhou, in fear, knelt and confessed. Wu Zetian did not execute Zhou but exiled him, and on the way to his place of exile, Zhou was killed by his enemies. (This incident inspired the Chinese proverb "invite the gentleman into the urn" (請君入甕, qing jun ru weng), now used for the concept of putting a person into a trap that he himself or she herself had set.)

Later that year, when investigating the general Zhang Qianxu (張虔勗), Lai interrogated Zhang and tortured him severely. Zhang, unable to stand the torture, yelled out to another official in charge of investigations, Xu Yougong (徐有功), who was known for being merciful. Angry that Zhang was yelling out to Xu, Lai had his guards slash Zhang to death with their swords and then beheaded him. When he subsequently investigated the prefect Yun Hongsi (雲弘嗣), he did not bother interrogating Yun—he just beheaded Yun and then forged a confession from Yun.

Yet later that year, the chancellors Cen Changqian and Ge Fuyuan offended Wu Zetian by strenuously opposing the proposal to elevate her powerful nephew Wu Chengsi to be crown prince, and she had them arrested. Lai coerced Cen's son the county magistrate of Lingyuan into implicating another chancellor, Ouyang Tong, whom Lai subsequently arrested and tortured. However, he was unable to get Ouyang to admit to treason, and so he forged a confession from Ouyang. Cen, Ge, and Ouyang were all executed. Lai also killed the general Li Anjing (李安靜).

In 692, Lai falsely accused the chancellors Ren Zhigu, Di Renjie, and Pei Xingben, along with other officials Cui Xuanli (崔宣禮), Lu Xian (盧獻), Wei Yuanzhong, and Li Sizhen (李嗣真) of treason. Lai tried to induce them to confess by citing an imperial edict that stated that those who confessed would be spared their lives, and Di confessed and was not tortured. He then wrote a petition on his blanket and hid it inside cotton clothes, and then had his family members take the clothes home to be changed into summer clothes. Wu Zetian thereafter became suspicious and inquired with Lai, who responded by forging, in the names of Di and the other officials, submissions thanking Wu Zetian for preparing to execute them. However, the young son of another chancellor who had been executed, Le Sihui, who was seized to be a servant at the ministry of agriculture, made a petition to Wu Zetian and told her that Lai was so skillful at manufacturing charges that even the most honest and faithful individuals would be forced into confessions by Lai. Wu Zetian thereafter summoned the seven accused officials and personally interrogated them, and after they disavowed the forged confessions, released but exiled them. Later that year, Lai demanded a bribe from the general Quan Xiancheng (泉獻誠), the grandson of the former Goguryeo regent Yŏn Kaesomun and, when Quan refused, falsely accused Quan of treason and had him strangled.

In 693, the officials Pei Feigong (裴匪躬) and Fan Yunxian (范雲仙) were accused of secretly meeting with the crown prince Li Dan (the former emperor), and when Fan tried to speak on his own behalf, Lai had his tongue cut off, and then had Pei and Fan both executed by being cut in half at the waist. Wu Zetian decreed that officials would not be allowed to meet with Li Dan. When, subsequently, there were secret accusations that Li Dan was plotting to overthrow her, she had Lai investigate Li Dan's associates, whom Lai arrested and tortured. One of them, An Jinzang, proclaimed Li Dan's innocence and cut his own abdomen, causing the organs to fall out. When Wu Zetian heard this, she was touched, and she had the imperial physicians treat An, barely saving his life, and on account of An's assurance that Li Dan was not plotting against her, ordered Lai to end his investigations against Li Dan. Meanwhile, Lai falsely accused the minister of public works, Su Gan (蘇幹), of having been a co-conspirator of Li Chong's, and had him executed.

Either in 693 or 694, Lai was accused by the imperial censor JI Lüzhong (紀履忠) of five crimes, including corruption, and initially, Lai was sentenced to death, but Wu Zetian, believing him to have accomplished much for her, spared his life and reduced him to commoner rank—and soon thereafter reinstated him as secretary general of palace affairs (殿中丞, Dianzhong Cheng). Lai was, however, thereafter again accused of corruption, and he was demoted to be a military officer at Tong Prefecture (同州, roughly modern Weinan, Shaanxi), interrupting his career as a secret police official.

== Second stint as secret police official ==
In 696, Lai Junchen was recalled to then-capital Luoyang to serve as the sheriff of Hegong County (合宮), one of the two counties making up Luoyang. In late 696, the sheriff of Mingtang County (明堂, one of the counties making up Chang'an), Ji Xu, heard about a treasonous plot by the officials Liu Sili (劉思禮), Qilian Yao (綦連耀), and Wang Ju (王勮) -- as the conspirators believed that Qilian was fated to be emperor one day. Ji relayed the plot to Lai, and had Lai submit a secret report of it. Wu Zetian had Wu Yizong (武懿宗) the Prince of Henan, the grandson of her uncle Wu Shiyi (武士逸), investigate. Liu implicated some 36 officials into the plot, and they and their families were executed. Lai, wanting to monopolize the rewards for reporting this plot, was prepared to falsely accuse Ji of crimes as well, but Ji found this out and submitted a secret petition; he was able to meet Wu Zetian, who promoted him, while Lai was further restored to good graces in Wu Zetian's eyes and was promoted to be the deputy minister of husbandry (司僕少卿, Sipu Shaoqing).

It was said that, particularly after this restoration to power, Lai did what he could to seize beautiful women for his gratification, finding ways to implicate and execute their husbands and then seize them. (He had been planning to seize a beautiful servant girl of Western Tujue's Jiezhongshizhu Khan Ashina Huseluo, then at Luoyang, and he therefore accused Ashina Huseluo of treason, but Ashina Huseluo escaped death when the chiefs of his subordinate tribes pleaded in front of the palace and cut their own faces to vouch for Ashina Huseluo.) It was further said that he created a book of the officials' names and then randomly chose whom to accuse by drawing lots, and that he compared himself to Shi Le, the founder of Later Zhao. As he had an inimical relationship with the censor Li Zhaode, he and another enemy of Li Zhaode's, Huangfu Wenbei (皇甫文備), falsely accused Li Zhaode of treason, and Li Zhaode was arrested later in 697.

Meanwhile, Lai was said to be ready for something much more major—falsely accusing Li Dan, his older brother Li Zhe the Prince of Luling (also a former emperor), the Wu clan imperial princes, and Wu Zetian's powerful daughter Princess Taiping, of treason as well, to wipe them out gradually to give himself a chance to start a coup to seize the throne himself. His friend Wei Suizhong (衛遂忠), publicly reported the plot, and the Wu clan princes and Princess Taiping responded by submitting accusations against Lai. Wu Zetian arrested Lai, and Lai was sentenced to death—but Wu Zetian, still believing that he was faithful to her, did not approve the execution order for three days. Only at Ji's urging did she approve the execution, and Lai and Li Zhaode were executed on the same day. It was said that the people mourned Li Zhaode while celebrating Lai's death—with his enemies cutting out his flesh and organs, consuming much of it in anger.

== Notes and references ==
- Old Book of Tang, vol. 186, part 1.
- New Book of Tang, vol. 209.
- Zizhi Tongjian, vols. 203, 204, 205, 206.
