= Dichomeris brevicornuta =

Scientific classification
- Kingdom: Animalia
- Phylum: Arthropoda
- Clade: Pancrustacea
- Class: Insecta
- Order: Lepidoptera
- Family: Gelechiidae
- Genus: Dichomeris
- Species: D. brevicornuta

Binomial name
- Dichomeris brevicornuta H.-H. Li, Zhen & Mey, 2013

Species of moth

Dichomeris brevicornuta is a moth in the family Gelechiidae. It was described by Hou-Hun Li, Hui Zhen, and Wolfram Mey in 2013. It is found in South Africa.

The wingspan is 10–11 mm.
