= Cen Changqian =

Chinese military general and politician of the Tang and Wu Zhou dynasties

Cen Changqian (Chinese: 岑長倩; died November 7, 691), briefly known as Wu Changqian (武長倩) during the reign of Wu Zetian, formally the Duke of Deng (鄧公), was a Chinese military general and politician of the Tang and Wu Zhou dynasties of China, serving as chancellor during the reign of Emperor Gaozong as well as Wu Zetian's reign and her earlier regency over her sons Emperor Zhongzong and Emperor Ruizong. In 691, he offended Wu Zetian by opposing the movement to declare her nephew Wu Chengsi crown prince (thus displacing the former Emperor Ruizong, whom she demoted to crown prince status in 690 after taking the throne herself), and he, along with his fellow chancellors Ge Fuyuan and Ouyang Tong, were accused of treason and executed.

== Background ==
It is not known when Cen Changqian was born. His father was Cen Wenshu (岑文叔), an older brother of Cen Wenben, who served as chancellor during the reign of Emperor Taizong of Tang. Cen Wenshu died early, so Cen Wenben raised Cen Changqian as his own son.

== During Emperor Gaozong's reign ==
As of 682, late in the reign of Emperor Gaozong, Cen Changqian was serving as the deputy minister of defense, when he was given the designation Tong Zhongshu Menxia Pingzhangshi (同中書門下平章事), making him a chancellor de facto.

== During Empress Dowager Wu's regency ==
Emperor Gaozong died in 683, and while his son Li Zhe succeeded him (as Emperor Zhongzong), his very powerful wife Empress Wu (later known as Wu Zetian) took over all power as regent and empress dowager. In spring 684, when Emperor Zhongzong displayed signs of independence, Empress Dowager Wu by official order deposed him and replaced him with his younger brother Li Dan the Prince of Yu (as Emperor Ruizong). However, Empress Dowager Wu held onto power even more firmly thereafter.

In 686, Cen, who was by that point minister of defense, was made Neishi (內史)—the head of the legislative bureau of government (鳳閣, Feng Ge) and a post considered one for a chancellor; he also continued to serve as minister of defense. In 688, when Emperor Gaozong's brother Li Zhen, the Prince of Yue, and Li Zhen's son Li Chong (李沖), the Prince of Langye, suspecting that Empress Dowager Wu was set on seizing the throne herself, rose in rebellion, Cen was one of the generals that Empress Dowager Wu sent against Li Zhen. Li Zhen was quickly defeated, and it is not clear whether Cen participated in Li Zhen's defeat.

In 690, Cen was made Wenchang Youxiang (文昌右相), one of the heads of the executive bureau of government (文昌臺, Wenchang Tai), and also carried the designation Tong Fengge Luantai Sanpin (同鳳閣鸞臺三品), signifying that he was still a chancellor.

== During Wu Zetian's reign ==
Later in 690, Empress Dowager Wu took the throne herself (and was thereafter known as Wu Zetian) and took the title of "emperor," demoting Emperor Ruizong to be crown prince, but with the unusual title of Huang Si (皇嗣) rather than the usual title of Huang Taizi (皇太子), and she changed the name of the state from Tang to Zhou (周). She encouraged people to submit signs of fortune and of Zhou's rise, and it was said that Cen Changqian, apprehensive of his situation, submitted a proposal to have Crown Prince Dan's surname changed from Li to Wu, which Wu Zetian accepted. To reward Cen, she created him the Duke of Deng, and further bestowed on him the surname of Wu as well as the honorific title Tejin (特進).

However, Cen would soon offend Wu Zetian and her Wu clan members. There had been a movement started by the official Zhang Jiafu and the commoner Wang Qingzhi (王慶之) to have Wu Zetian's nephew Wu Chengsi made crown prince—under the theory that given that Wu Zetian was now emperor, she should be succeeded by a member of the Wu clan rather than her husband's Li clan. They circulated a petition among officials, and Cen refused to sign—and further suggested to Wu Zetian that, as Wu Dan was already crown prince, this proposal should be firmly rejected and that the group of people that Zhang and Wang had gathered before the palace to petition Wu Zetian should be disbanded. He was supported in this by fellow chancellor Ge Fuyuan. Cen and Ge's actions offended both Wu Zetian and her Wu clan members.

At that time Buddhist monks from He Prefecture (和州, roughly modern Chaohu, Anhui) -- especially Xu Huaiyi -- submitted a sutra, the Dayun Sutra (Great Cloud Sutra, 大雲經), which purportedly foretold Wu Zetian's rise to power. They also released the Commentary on the Great Cloud Sutra, which laid out the argument that the sutra was an omen of her ascent to leadership. Wu Zetian issued an edict that this find be commemorated by the construction of the impressive Dayun Temple (大雲寺). Cen opposed this as well, further drawing her displeasure. To remove Cen from the capital Luoyang, in late 690, she ordered him lead an army against the Tufan, but even before his army could reach the front, she recalled him to Luoyang and imprisoned him. One of Wu Zetian's favored secret police officials, Lai Junchen, then tortured Cen's son who was serving as Magistrate of Lingyuan (靈源) and obtained a confession implicating Ge and fellow chancellor Ouyang Tong, as well as a large group of other officials. In winter 691, Cen Changqian, Ge, and Ouyang were all executed. Cen Changqian's five sons were forced to commit suicide, and his ancestral tombs were destroyed. Dozens upon dozens of officials and their relatives (including Cen's) were executed, exiled, or fled to Southern China during the reign of Wu Zetian. After Emperor Ruizong was eventually restored to the throne in 710, he restored Cen's titles and reburied him with honor. His nephew (actually son of his cousin i.e. a grandson of Cen Wenben) Cen Xi later also served as a chancellor during Emperor Ruizong's and Emperor Xuanzong's reigns.

== Notes and references ==
- Old Book of Tang, vol. 70.
- New Book of Tang, vol. 102.
- Zizhi Tongjian, vols. 203, 204.
