= Qingshan Prison =

Prison in Chaohu City, Anhui, China

Qingshan Prison is a prison in Chaohu City, Anhui, China established in 1972. Originally Prov. No. 3 LRD, or Baihu Farm. In 1992, organization status changed to 'prison.' Has an area of 67.8 square meters, employs 225 guards, and 80% of the prisoners are severe criminals. The prison produces and assembles electric components, makes wool sweaters, and processes gemstones.

== See also ==
- List of prisons in Anhui
