= Chaohu Prison =

Prison in Chaohu, Anhui, China

Chaohu Prison is a prison in Chaohu, Anhui, China. It was established in 1959. It is the province's 3rd largest prison currently employing over 1200 guards and other employees. Most of the inmates here are sentenced to life or serving commuted death sentences. The factory was established in 1959 and is a national key enterprise in the machinery industry. It is also a special enterprise designated by the Ministry of Railways to produce railway parts. Products made here are used in all railway engineering departments throughout China.

== See also ==
- List of prisons in Anhui
