= List of prisons in Chongqing =

This is a list of prisons in Chongqing, China.

Name	Enterprise name	City/County/District	Village/Town	Established	Notes
Chongqing Juvenile Offender Detachment		Jiangbei District	Maojiashan	1954	manufactures polystyrene products, printing goods
Chongqing Prison	Xinshang Laodong Plant, Xinsheng Electronics Corporation	Nan'an District	Danzishi		
Chongqing Women's Prison		Yongchuan District	Yueqinba, Honglu Town		holds about 2000 inmates, has shoe manufacturing and clothing workshops
Fengcheng Prison	Brickyard	Changshou District	Yanjia		more than 1800 prisoners in 2004
Fuling Prison	Fuling No. 2 Flax Mill	Fuling	Shilukou, Guixi, Dianjiang County		
Jinhua Prison	Tea Factory; Plywood Board Factory	Zhong County	Jinghuashan, Huangqin		
Jiulong Prison		Jiulongpo District	Yueyuan, Zouma Town		
Nanchuan Prison		Nanchuan District	Shuijang		
Sanhe Prison	Wanzhou Binjiang Construction Engineering Company	Wanzhou District	Fenshui		
Sanxia Prison	Chongqing Dingjian Business	Wanzhou District	Changtan		Business established in 2004
Yongchuan Prison	Xinsheng Tea Farm	Yongchuan District	Zhongbacun	1952	Xinsheng Tea Farm is the largest tea farm in China, produces Yuzhou Tea, Bi Luochun green tea, Yinzhen tea and Mao Feng tea. Yearly total of about a thousand inmates
Yuzhou Prison		Jiangbei District	Tangjiatuo		Holds political prisoners and Falun Gong persons, meals and toilets are in the same room
