= Lujiang Prison =

Prison in Chaohu, Anhui, China

Lujiang Prison is a prison in Chaohu City, Anhui, China established in 1957, with an area of 987mu. It is a high security prison for serious offenders, currently employing over 1,600 inmates. The prison is one of China's largest national valve manufacturers that produces standard valves. In 1997, it received (DNV)ISO9002 quality system authentication via Norwegian Classification Society. In 1998, it had large shares of stock in Shanghai East China Valve Ltd. In 1998, the prison received Anhui Province prize for quality control. Lujiang Changtai Machine Works was approved by the State Economic and Trade Commission to manage valve factory's imports and exports. Products are exported to other countries including Britain and the US. Several valves are best-selling in over 60 countries and regions, including the US, Japan, Britain, France, and Germany.

== See also ==
- List of prisons in Anhui
