= Li Shangjin =

Li Shangjin (李上金) (? - 690) was the third son of Emperor Gaozong of Tang. His mother was a palace maid surnamed Yang (楊). When Gaozong ascended the throne, Shangjin was created Prince of Qi (杞王). In 652, he was appointed governor of Yizhou (益州) in titular. In 666, he was appointed prefect of Shou (寿州), then prefect of Lu (漉州). But as his mother was disliked by Empress Wu, some officials falsely accused Shangjin to please her, and Shangjin was removed from his office. Shangjin was then sent to Li Prefecture (澧州, in modern Changde, Hunan).

In 682, Empress Wu pretended to be so friendly that she recalled Shangjin and allowed him to attend political affairs, along with his younger half-brother Li Sujie Prince of Poyang (鄱陽王) born by the late Consort Xiao. But soon she appointed Shangjin as prefect of Mian (沔州), Sujie as prefect of Yue Prefect (岳州), and would never allow them to attend political affairs. In 684, Shangjin returned to the capital for the funeral of his father along with Sujie, Princess Yiyang (義陽公主) and Princess Xuancheng (宣城公主). The two princesses were also born by Consort Xiao. In the same year Shangjin was recreated Prince of Bi (畢王), later Prince of Ze (澤王) and appointed as prefect of Suzhou (蘇州). In the following year he was appointed as prefect of Chen. In 689, he was appointed as Taizi Zuoweishuai (太子左卫率) and prefect of Suizhou (隨州).

In 690, Wu Chengsi, nephew of Empress Wu, instructed Zhou Xing accuse Shangjin and Sujie of treason, and they were recalled to Luoyang. When hearing Sujie had been strangled, Shangjin was so afraid that he hanged himself.

Shangjin had seven sons. After his death, they were all exiled to Xianzhou and six of them (Yizhen, Yimei, Yizhang, Yihuan, Yijin and Yisui; 李義珍、李義玫、李義璋、李義環、李義瑾、李義璲) died there. When Shangjin's another younger half-brother Emperor Zhongzong of Tang (born by Empress Wu) held power, Shangjin was rehabilitated, and his only living son Yixun (李義珣) succeeded his title as Prince of Ze. But in New Book of Tang, Shangjin had nine sons named Yiyu, Yijin, Yichen, Yizhen, Yixian, Yiwei, Yimei, Yigui and Yixun (李義瑜、李義璡、李義琛、李義珍、李義现、李義玮、李義玫、李義珪、李義珣), and Yiyu was created Prince of Changping.
