= Chaohu Stadium =

Sports venue in Chaohu, China

Coordinates: 31°36′23″N 117°50′05″E

- Interactive map of Chaohu Stadium
- Full name: Chaohu Stadium
- Location: Chaohu, China
- Capacity: 30,000

Construction
- Groundbreaking: April 2010
- Opened: 2012

Chaohu Stadium (simplified Chinese: 巢湖市体育馆; traditional Chinese: 巢湖市體育館) is a sports facility in Chaohu, China. The facility is nearly 18,000 square meters and was built at a cost of RMB125 million. It broke ground in 2010 and opened on 15 May 2013.

The stadium was planned mainly for football with a capacity of 30,000.
