= Wang Fangqing =

Chinese politician during Tang and Zhou dynasty

Wang Fangqing (王方慶; died c.June 702), formal name Wang Lin (王綝) but went by the courtesy name of Fangqing, formally Duke Zhen of Shiquan (石泉貞公), was a Chinese politician during the Tang dynasty and Wu Zetian's Zhou dynasty, serving as a chancellor during Wu Zetian's reign.

== Background ==
It is not known when Wang Fangqing was born, but it is known that his family was from the Tang dynasty's capital prefecture Yong Prefecture (雍州, roughly modern Xi'an, Shaanxi). He came from a line of officials who had served during the Jin dynasty (266–420) and the subsequent Liu Song, Southern Qi, and the Liang dynasty, until his great-grandfather Wang Bao (王褒) surrendered to Northern Zhou when Northern Zhou forces captured the then-Liang capital Jiangling in 554. Wang Bao and his descendants thereafter served as officials of Northern Zhou and its successors Sui dynasty and Tang. Wang Fangqing's father Wang Hongzhi (王弘直) successively served as advisor to Li Yuanchang (李元昌) the Prince of Han and Li Yuanjing (李元景) the Prince of Jing, sons of Tang's founder Emperor Gaozu.

Wang Fangqing himself started his official service at age 15, when he served on the military staff of Li Zhen the Prince of Yue, a son of Emperor Taizong (Emperor Gaozu's son and successor). He studied the Records of the Grand Historian and Book of Han under Li Zhen's secretary Ren Xigu (任希古), and later, when Ren became a staff member of the crown prince, Wang followed him and continued to study under him. During Emperor Taizong's successor Emperor Gaozong's Yongchun era (682-683), Wang was promoted to be the deputy minister of husbandry (太僕少卿, Taipu Shaoqing), and on one occasion, when Emperor Gaozong was considering creating his grandson Li Chongzhao the unprecedented title of deputy crown prince (皇太孫, Huang Taisun), he consulted Wang, who opined that the action was unprecedented and yet Emperor Gaozong could, if he so wanted, create a new tradition. After Emperor Gaozong's death later in 683, his powerful wife Empress Wu (later known as Wu Zetian) became empress dowager and regent successively over their sons Emperor Zhongzong (whom she deposed in 684) and Emperor Ruizong. During her regency, Wang became the commandant at Guang Prefecture (廣州, roughly modern Guangzhou, Guangdong). Guang Prefecture was at that point becoming increasingly important as a port of international trade, and Wang's predecessor Lu Yuanrui (路元睿) was assassinated in 684 by Malay merchants after he had improperly seized their merchandise. After Wang succeeded Lu, he was said to be honest and clean, never taking bribes. Moreover, within his territory, there had long been tribal leaders who had received special treatment and who were corrupt, who in turn kept their corruption going by bribing the officials. Wang ordered the officials to stop associating with the tribal leaders and arrested the most corrupt of the tribal leaders. The public sentiment at the time believed that since the start of Tang, there had not been anyone who had governed Guang Prefecture better than Wang, and Empress Dowager Wu issued an edict honoring his achievements.

== During Wu Zetian's reign ==
In 695, Wu Zetian, who by that point had taken the throne from Emperor Ruizong as "emperor," establishing a new Zhou dynasty and interrupting Tang, recalled Wang Fangqing to serve as the secretary general of the then-capital prefecture Luo Prefecture (洛州, roughly modern Luoyang, Henan). She soon gave him the honorific title of Yinqing Guanglu Daifu (銀青光祿大夫) and created him the Baron of Shiquan. In 696, she made him the secretary general at Bing Prefecture (并州, roughly modern Taiyuan, Shanxi) and created him the Baron of Langye—but even before he departed for Bing Prefecture, made him instead Luantai Shilang (鸞臺侍郎), the deputy head of the examination bureau of government (鸞臺, Luantai). She also gave him the designation of Tong Fengge Luantai Pingzhangshi (同鳳閣鸞臺平章事), making him a chancellor de facto. His office was soon changed to be Fengge Shilang (鳳閣侍郎), the deputy head of the legislative bureau (鳳閣, Fengge), and he remained chancellor de facto with the Tong Fengge Luantai Pingzhangshi designation.

In 697, after Wu Youyi (武攸宜) the Prince of Jian'an, the grandson of Wu Zetian's uncle Wu Shirang (武士讓), had returned victoriously from a campaign against Khitan forces, tradition called for the playing of a military band as Wu Youyi returned to the capital Luoyang. The chancellor Wang Jishan, as the month that Wu Youyi was returning was the same month when Emperor Gaozong died, requested that the band be only present but not playing. Wang Fangqing, citing precedents from the Jin dynasty, argued that the band should only not play if Wu Youyi were returning on the same day of Emperor Gaozong's death, advocated that the band still play, and Wu Zetian agreed. Around the same time, there was an occasion when Wu Zetian was visiting Yuquan Temple (玉泉寺) at Mount Wan'an (萬安山, near Luoyang). The path up the mountain was steep, and she considered going up the mountain in a litter. Wang Fangqing advocated against it, arguing that it was too dangerous for the sovereign to take such a journey, and she agreed. Later that year, she upgraded his title to Viscount of Shiquan. Also, around the same time, there was a discussion as to whether the ceremony of having the emperor personally declare the start of each month should be abolished as not being referred to in the Confucian classics. Wang Fangqing advocated that the ceremonies be kept in place, and Wu Zetian agreed.

Wang kept a large collection of books at his mansion, and on one occasion, Wu Zetian visited his mansion to request to see some of his ancestors' calligraphy. Wang stated that his family had previously already submitted the calligraphy of Wang Xizhi (of another line of his clan) to Emperor Taizong, but that he was willing to submit the calligraphy of his 11th generation ancestor Wang Dao as well as 27 other ancestors' calligraphy. Wu Zetian displayed the calligraphy to the officials and had an official of the legislative bureau, Cui Rong (崔融), collect them into a collection, and then awarded the collection back to Wang, considered a great honor at the time.

In 698, the chancellor Di Renjie advocated recalling Li Zhe the Prince of Luling (the former Emperor Zhongzong) from exile—a suggestion that Wang Jishan and Wang Fangqing concurred in and was also advocated by Wu Zetian's close advisor Ji Xu and her lovers Zhang Yizhi and Zhang Changzong. Wu Zetian agreed and recalled Li Zhe from exile, and soon created him crown prince. Later that year, Wang Fangqing, on account of failing health, requested a less important position, and Wu Zetian made him the director of the imperial library (麟臺監, Lintai Jian), no longer chancellor. Once Li Zhe (whose name was then changed to Li Xian) was made crown prince, she also made Wang Fangqing a member of his staff. In 699, she created him the Duke of Shiquan and ordered that his salary be the same as if he were still a chancellor, and also ordered him to teach Li Xian in his studies. He died in c.June 702 and was buried with honor. It was said, however, that as his sons did not attend to his great book collections, the collections were gradually lost after his death.

== Notes and references ==
- Old Book of Tang, vol. 89.
- New Book of Tang, vol. 129.
- Zizhi Tongjian, vols. 203, 205, 206.
