= Shi Wuzi =

Shi Wuzi (史務滋) (died January 2, 691) was a Chinese politician of the Chinese Tang dynasty and Wu Zetian's Zhou dynasty, serving briefly as chancellor during Wu Zetian's reign.

It is not known when Shi Wuzi was born, but it is known that he was from Liyang (溧陽, in modern Changzhou, Jiangsu). As of 690, when Wu Zetian had just taken over the throne from her son Emperor Ruizong, establishing Zhou and interrupting Tang, Shi was serving as the minister of vassal affairs (司賓卿, Sibin Qin), when she promoted him to be Nayan (納言), the head of the examination bureau of government (鸞臺, Luantai) -- a post considered one for a chancellor. She subsequently commissioned him and nine other officials to tour the 10 circuits that the empire was divided into.

In 691, the assistant imperial censor Lai Zixun (來子珣) falsely accused the official Liu Xinggan (劉行感), his brothers Liu Xingshi (劉行實) and Liu Xingyu (劉行瑜), and nephew Liu Qiantong (劉虔通) of treason. Wu Zetian put Shi and her secret police official Lai Junchen in charge of the investigations. Shi was friendly with Liu Xinggan and tried to find ways to absolve him and his family members, but could not, and Liu Xinggan and his brothers and nephew were all executed. Afterwards, Lai Junchen reported to Wu Zetian that Shi was trying to absolve the Lius. Wu Zetian ordered Lai Junchen to investigate Shi as well. Shi, in fear, committed suicide.

== Notes and references ==
- Old Book of Tang, vol. 90.
- New Book of Tang, vol. 114.
- Zizhi Tongjian, vol. 204.
