= Ma'anshan Prison =

Prison in Ma'anshan, China

Ma'anshan Prison is a prison in Ma'anshan, Anhui, China. It was established in 1964. Formerly known as the Ma'anshan Pipe-casting Works. With funding from the City Metallurgy and Building Materials Bureau (taken from the former Pipe-casting Works), the Magang General Company and the Prov. Ma'anshan Trust jointly managed the creation of the Magang Julong Company. In August 2006 began building a new construction that will hold 3000 inmates, 540 People's Police, and will cover an area of 400.46mu. It will be a high-security, medium-sized prison.

== See also ==
- List of prisons in Anhui
