= Anqing Prison =

Prison in Daguan, Anhui, China

Anqing Prison is a prison in Daguan, Anhui, China. It was established in 1906 and is the oldest prison still in use in the province. During the late Qing Dynasty it was known as "Anqing Criminal Training Center." During the Republic of China period it was called Yinmatang Prison. In May 1949, it was renamed North Anhui Anqing Administrative Area Prison. In June 1952 it was changed to Anqing public security office LRD (labor reform detachment). In June 1955 it was renamed No.2 Prison. In 1995 it was renamed to Anhui Anqing prison. The prison houses serious offenders. The prison enterprise consists of Anqing Wanjiang Color Weaving Company which includes a colored woven cloth factory, a garment factory, a machinery factory, and Qingfeng Plastics Factory. The prison mainly does machinery and garment processing.

== See also ==
- List of prisons in Anhui
