= List of prisons in Jiangsu =

This is a list of prisons in Jiangsu.

Name	Enterprise name	City/County/District	Village/Town	Established	Notes
Changzhou Prison	Cement Factory; Valve Plant; Labor Service Processing Plant	Changzhou	Zhuze	1952	In an average year it holds about 7, 000 inmates, of which 800 are female. It has about 2, 000 new inmates annually. It is the largest prison in the province
Dingshan Prison	Dingshan Cement Plant	Yixing	Dingshu	1951	
Gaochun Prison		Gaochun County, Nanjing		1969	In Huashan
Gaoyou Prison	Gaoyou Farm	Gaoyou			
Guanyun Prison	Wutuhe Farm	Guanyun County		1951	In Qidaogou, area of 75 km²
Hongzehu Prison	Hongze Farm; Hongxing Chemical Plant	Sihong County		1952	Was established as Xinren Farm, in 1956 was divided into Dayou, Minsheng, Xindang and Chaohe Farms. The farm used to be called Prov. Huaiyang Prison, inter alia. The number of inmates is about 2,200
Huaiyin Prison	Hongze Farm			1977	Among the products are wrenches of Jinling brand, duck meat of Bailu brand and rice of Maihua brand. Includes Jiangsu Jianhuai Tools Co. Ltd. Wrenches and box wrenches are sold to Europe, the United States, the Middle East and Southeast Asia.
Jiangning Prison	Cement No.1 Factory; Cement No.2 Factory	Jiangning District, Nanjing			
Jinling Prison	Cement Factory; Clothing Company	Nanjing		1983	
Jurong Prison	Wanshan Coal Mine; Cement Factory; Clothing Factory			1973	
Liyang Prison	Zhuangzhu Farm; Zhuze Coal Mine; Clothing Factory; Bearing No.1 Plant; Bearing No.2 Plant; Casting Plant	Liyang	Shezhu	1951	Area of 17,5 km²
Longtan Prison	Jiangsu Shuanglongtan Group (Originally Longtan Cement Plant)		Longtan	1952	In Zhuzishan. In 1998, Jinling Cement Plant (Jinling Prison) and Wanshan Cement Plant (Jurong Prison) broke off to form separate companies. Produces Shuanghou brand cement and electromechanical integrated cement machine equipment of Baozhu brand
Nanjing Prison	Xinsheng Factory; Knit Sweater Factory		Tiexinqiao	1905	produces machinery for export to Hongkong
Nanjing Women's Prison		Yuhuatai District, Nanjing	Tiexinqiao		Capacity for 1,400 inmates. 1.1% with sentences less than 2 years, 17.7% sentences from 2 to 5 years, 18.1% from 5 to 7 years, 15.9% 7 to 10 years, 14.4% 10 to 12 years, 9.6 12 to 15 years, 10% 15 years or more, 7.8% have life sentences
Nantong Prison	Nantong Knitting & Dyeing Factory; Xinsheng Weaving Factory	Nantong			About 2,500 inmates
Nantong Women's Prison		Nantong			More than 1,500 prisoners
Pengcheng Prison	Dahu Cement Plant				Formerly known as Yunhu Prison, Most of the prisoners serve sentences of less than 10 years
Provincial Juvenile Offender Detachment	Ji’nan Farm	Zhenjiang	Ji'nan, Jurong, Jiangsu		
Provincial No. 2 Juvenile Offender Detachment	Xiaomaoshan Ceramics	Zhenjiang	Jurong, Jiangsu		In Xiaomaoshan, result of a 1985 merger of Xiaomaoshan Ceramics Factory with Gucheng Juvenile Offenders Department. 3, 600 juvenile inmates, mostly serving sentences of 10 years or more
Pukou Prison	Nanjing No. 4 Machine Tool Works; Casting Plant	Pukou District, Nanjing		1957	In Shifosi
Suzhou Prison	Xinhua Machine Works			1910	Can hold 4,000 inmates
Tongzhou Prison	Xinsheng Weaving Plant; LeatherShoe Plant		Huanben		Over 3,000, near Huanghai sea
Wuxi Prison	Jianhua Machine Tool Works	Wuxi		1950	For prisoners serving 10 years or more
Xuzhou Prison	Xuzhou Pressure Machinery Stock Co. Ltd. (formerly Xuzhou Forging and Pressure Equipment Plant)	Xuzhou			Products are sold to Europe, Southeast Asia, the Middle East and Africa.
Yancheng Prison	Dazhong Farm	Dafeng, Yancheng	Xianhe		Bilu brand rice, Jianghuai brand crops, Daye brand painting and lifting machines, Xianhe brand plastic products, Dazhu brand wear-resistant castings
Yixing Prison	Furong Tea Farm; Casting Plant; Special Steel Mill			1951	In Furongsi, 2,800 inmates as of August 2006, produces Furong brand tea
Zhenjiang Prison	Zhenjiang Xinxin Factory	Zhenjiang		1935	Houses over 3,000 inmates

== Sources ==
- "Laogai Handbook 2007-2008" (PDF) (in Chinese and English). Washington, D.C.: Laogai Research Foundation. October 2008. pp. 271–290. ISBN 978-1-931550-25-3.
