= Ji Xu =

Ji Xu (Chinese: 吉頊) was a Chinese politician during Wu Zetian's Zhou dynasty, serving briefly as chancellor.

== Background ==
It is not known when Ji Xu was born, but it is known that he was from the Zhou capital Luoyang. He was said to be tall, good at hiding his emotions, but daring to speak. After passing the imperial examination, he was made the sheriff of Mingtang County (明堂), one of the counties making up the western capital Chang'an. At that time, his father Ji Zhe (吉哲) was serving as the prefect of Yi Prefecture (易州, in modern Baoding, Hebei) and was accused of receiving bribes, a capital offense. Ji Xu went to see Wu Zetian's powerful nephew Wu Chengsi and offered to have his two younger sisters become Wu Chengsi's servant girls. Ji Xu's sisters, after being delivered to Wu Chengsi's mansion, however, would not speak for three days, and he asked them why—and they responded, "Our father has violated the law and is set to be sentenced to death, and therefore we are worried." Wu Chengsi interceded on Ji Zhe's behalf, and Ji Zhe was spared.

== Rise to prominence ==
In 697, Ji Xu heard that the official Liu Sili (劉思禮) had been involved in a treasonous plot to make another official, Qilian Yao (綦連耀), emperor. He reported this to fellow sheriff Lai Junchen—a previously powerful secret service official who had been demoted—and let Lai report this to Wu Zetian. As a part of subsequent investigation ordered by Wu Zetian, 36 families were slaughtered. Lai then wanted to monopolize Wu Zetian's awards, and therefore began to accuse Ji Xu of crimes. When Ji Xu heard this, he made an emergency secret report to Wu Zetian, and when she summoned him to her presence, he defended himself. Therefore, while Lai became powerful again, Ji was also promoted.

Later that year, when Lai was accused of planning to falsely accuse the Wu clan imperial princes and Wu Zetian's daughter Princess Taiping, Princess Taiping and the Wu clan princes reported this to Wu Zetian, and she arrested him, but was not certain whether to execute him, as she believed that he had contributed to her reign. On an occasion when Wu Zetian was touring her garden, Ji was attending to her, and she asked him whether there was anything unusual happening among the people. He pointed out that the people were surprised that, despite the serious crimes that Lai was accused of Wu Zetian had not put him to death. Wu Zetian, accepting Ji's suggestion that Lai should be put to death, and did so. She also promoted Ji to be an assistant censor. It was said that because Ji was talented and full of strategies, Wu Zetian greatly trusted him as a strategist.

== As Wu Zetian's confidant ==
At this time, Wu Zetian's son Li Dan, a former emperor of the Tang dynasty, which was interrupted by Wu Zetian's reign, was crown prince, but her nephews Wu Chengsi and Wu Sansi had designs on the position, and were constantly having their associates lobby for them, pointing out that no emperor had ever designated someone of a different clan as heir. Ji, who was friendly with Wu Zetian's lovers Zhang Yizhi and Zhang Changzong, advised them that they would be in desperate situations if Wu Zetian should die and suggested that they should suggest the return of Li Dan's older brother Li Zhe, the Prince of Luling, himself a former emperor whom Wu Zetian had deposed and exiled—something also advocated by the chancellors Di Renjie, Wang Fangqing, and Wang Jishan. The Zhangs did so, and Wu Zetian, knowing that it was Ji who had given them the idea, summoned Ji and questioned him about it. At Ji's further urging, Wu Zetian agreed with the proposal and, in 698, recalled Li Zhe to the capital. Soon, Li Dan offered to yield the position of crown prince, and Wu Zetian created Li Zhe crown prince and changed his name to Li Xian.

Also in 698, there was a major Eastern Tujue attack. Wu Zetian made Ji the prefect of Xiang Prefecture (相州, in modern Handan, Hebei), and placed him in charge of reviewing the affairs of the armies she sent against Eastern Tujue forces. Ji initially declined the appointment, claiming that he knew nothing about military matters, and she responded, "The thieves [(i.e., the Eastern Tujue forces)] will be departing, and I want you to calm the people." During the campaign, Ji observed that the people were glad to serve on the campaign when they heard that Li Xian had been nominally put in command of the army, and he told this to Wu Zetian, who in turn told him to publicize it to imperial officials. Because of this, the Wu clan imperial princes despised him. After the end of the campaign, there was an occasion when Ji and Wu Yizong (武懿宗), the Prince of Henan, a grandson of Wu Zetian's uncle Wu Shiyi (武士逸), were arguing over whose contributions during the Eastern Tujue campaign was greater—and during the argument, Ji, who was tall and strong, physically imposed himself over Wu Yizong, who was short and bent in his stature, leading Wu Zetian to be displeased, commenting to herself, "Ji Xu even disrespects the Wus in my presence. After that certain day [(i.e., her death)], how can I depend on him?" Still, in 699, she made him an imperial attendant, along with Zhang Yizhi, Zhang Changzong, Tian Guidao (田歸道), Li Jiongxiu, Xue Ji, and Yuan Banqian (員半千). She soon made him the deputy minister of civil service affairs (天官侍郎, Tianguan Shilang) and gave him the designation Tong Fengge Luantai Pinzhangshi (同鳳閣鸞臺平章事), making him a chancellor de facto. While he was serving as chancellor, Wu Zetian, still displeased over his disrespect for Wu Yizong, on an occasion when Ji was reporting on matters of state and citing various historical incidents to support his argument, in order to frighten him, intentionally showed her anger, stating:

What you have stated I have heard many times, and you need not repeat it. Emperor Taizong [(father of Wu Zetian's husband Emperor Gaozong, of whom Wu Zetian had once been concubine)] had a horse with the name "Lion Stallion," and it was so large and strong that no one could get on its back. I was a lady in waiting attending to Emperor Taizong, and I suggested to him, "I only need three things to subordinate it: an iron whip, an iron hammer, and a sharp dagger. I will whip it with the iron whip. If it does not submit, I will hammer its head with the iron hammer. If it still does not submit, I will cut its throat with the dagger." Emperor Taizong praised my bravery. Do you really believe that you are qualified to dirty my dagger?

Ji, in fear and sweating profusely, knelt and begged for forgiveness, and Wu Zetian did not take any actions against him at the time.

== Fall from power ==
However, the Wu clan princes, still despising Ji Xu, reported in 700 that Ji's younger brother had submitted false documentations in order to be made an official. As a result, Ji Xu was demoted to be the sheriff of Angu County (安固, in modern Wenzhou, Zhejiang). Before he departed, he had a last meeting with Wu Zetian, in which he wept and stated, "I am departing far from the palace gate, and I may never see Your Imperial Majesty again. However, I have some final words." Wu Zetian ordered him to sit down and asked him what he had to say. He said, "If clay and water are mixed into mud, do clay and water have any dispute with each other?" She responded, "Of course not." He then said, "If you divide the mud, taking one half and molding it into a Buddha, and taking the other half and molding it into a Tianzun, do they have a dispute with each other?" She responded, "Of course." Ji then bowed and stated:

The imperial clan and the imperial relatives [(i.e., the Wus)] both have their positions and help the empire to be secure. Now, the Crown Prince's position is settled, but the imperial relatives are still princes. Your Imperial Majesty, in effect, are forcing them into a fight, and both sides are insecure.

She responded, "I know this as well, but the situation is already like this, and there is nothing I can do."

Ji appeared to not have actually reported to Angu, but instead settled in Yang Prefecture (揚州, roughly modern Yangzhou, Jiangsu), and died soon thereafter. His contribution to the Tang dynasty's restoration was not recognized until Li Dan was restored to the throne in 710 as Emperor Ruizong, and Emperor Ruizong posthumously honored him.

== Notes and references ==
- Old Book of Tang, vol. 186, part 1.
- New Book of Tang, vol. 117.
- Zizhi Tongjian, vol. 206.
