= Jiucheng Administration Branch =

Prison in Anhui, China

Jiucheng Administration Branch is a prison in Wangjiang County, Anhui, China established in 1957. It is one of the province's 2 largest agricultural prisons. It is located on the borders of Wangjiang and Susong Counties covering an area of 54,000 square kilometres (21,000 sq mi) and employing over 2000 guards. It controls 5 large-scale prisons including Bohu, Dongjiaohu, Menghu, Huanghu, and Majiahu. In 2002, the prison shifted from agriculture to the service industry. In 2005 it housed roughly 5,000 inmates whose labor is used to produce clothing, wool sweaters for export, to work with silver paper processing, and to continue with agricultural production. Inmates are forced to work up to 16 hours a day.

== See also ==
- List of prisons in Anhui
