= Yongchuan Prison =

Prison in Chongqing, China

Yongchuan Prison is a prison in the municipality of Chongqing, China. It was established in 1952. It is located on the Xinsheng Tea Farm, and is the largest tea farm in China producing Yuzhou Tea, Biluochun green tea, Junshan Yinzhen tea, and Maofeng tea. It has approximately one thousand inmates.

== See also ==
- List of prisons in Chongqing municipality
