= Wuhu Prison =

Prison in Wuhu, Anhui, China

Wuhu Prison is a prison in Wuhu, Anhui, China, established in 1905, named in 1915 and renamed Prov. No. 1 Prison in 1949. In the 1970s, its male inmates were moved to Fuyang City and female inmates to the Suzhou Women's Prison. It then became a juvenile offender detachment that includes a cotton mill and produces metal parts.

== See also ==
- List of prisons in Anhui
