= Fuyang Prison =

Prison in Fuyang, Anhui, China

Fuyang Prison is a prison in Fuyang, Anhui, China. It was established in 1971.

== See also ==
- List of prisons in Anhui
