= Ouyang Tong =

Chinese calligrapher and politician of the Tang and Wu Zhou dynasties

Ouyang Tong (歐陽通) (died November 7, 691), formally the Viscount of Bohai (渤海子), was a Chinese calligrapher and politician of the Tang and Wu Zhou dynasties of China, serving briefly as chancellor during Wu Zetian's reign.

== Background ==
It is not known when Ouyang Tong was born, but it is known that his family hailed from Tan Prefecture (roughly modern Changsha, Hunan). His father Ouyang Xun was a famed calligrapher and served as an official during Tang's predecessor the Sui dynasty and the early Tang dynasty, receiving the title of Baron of Bohai, dying in his 80s.

Ouyang Tong was said to be still young when Ouyang Xun died. His mother Lady Xu taught him the calligraphic techniques of Ouyang Xun and gave him money when he wrote well. Eventually, Ouyang Tong was nearly as good at calligraphy as his father.

== During Emperor Gaozong's reign and Emperor Ruizong's first reign ==
By Emperor Gaozong's Yifeng era (676–679), Ge had become Zhongshu Sheren (中書舍人), a mid-level official at the legislative bureau of government (中書省, Zhongshu Sheng). When his mother died, he was recalled to the imperial administration after observing a brief mourning period, but throughout the next four years, whenever he went home, he would change into mourning clothes and live in a small hut. During the Chuigong era of Emperor Gaozong's son Emperor Ruizong, he served as the director of palace affairs and was created the Viscount of Bohai.

== During Wu Zetian's reign ==
In 690, Emperor Ruizong's mother Empress Dowager Wu took the throne herself as "emperor," establishing the Zhou dynasty and interrupting the Tang dynasty. She made Ouyang Tong the minister of defense (夏官尚書, Xiaguan Shangshu). In 691, he was made minister of rites (司禮卿, Siling Qing) and acting Nayan (納言), the head of the examination bureau of government (鳳閣, Fengge) and a post considered one for a chancellor.

However, about a month later, Ouyang became engulfed in a controversy and offended Wu Zetian. At that time, there was a movement led by one Wang Qingzhi (王慶之) to have Wu Zetian's nephew Wu Chengsi created crown prince, displacing her son Li Dan (the former Emperor Ruizong). Ouyang's senior colleague Cen Changqian strenuously opposed and wanted that Wang's group of petitioners be disbanded. Ouyang supported Cen. As a result, Wu Zetian had him, Cen, and another chancellor Ge Fuyuan arrested and interrogated by her secret police official Lai Junchen. Lai tortured Ouyang severely, but Ouyang refused to confess to treason, so Lai forged a confession in his name. Soon, Ouyang, Cen, and Ge were executed. After Wu Zetian was overthrown in a coup in 705 and her son Li Xian, himself a former emperor, was restored to the throne (as Emperor Zhongzong), Ouyang's titles were posthumously restored.

== Notes and references ==
- Old Book of Tang, vol. 189, part 1.
- New Book of Tang, vol. 198.
- Zizhi Tongjian, vol. 204.
