= Shushan Prison =

Prison in Hefei, Anhui, China

Shushan Prison is a prison in Hefei, Anhui, China. It was established in 1955. As in June 2006 it employed 300 police and held 1,500 inmates serving sentences of 10–20 years.

== See also ==
- List of prisons in Anhui
