= Chongqing Juvenile Offender Detachment =

Prison in Chongqing, China

Chongqing Juvenile Offender Detachment is a prison in the municipality of Chongqing, China.

The prison was established in 1954.

== See also ==
- List of prisons in Chongqing municipality
