= Bengbu Prison =

Prison in Bengbu, Anhui, China

Bengbu Prison is a prison in Bengbu, Anhui, China. It was established in 1958. The prison houses severe criminals and on average holds roughly 2,000 inmates. The prison enterprise mainly deals with the processing and production of rubber hoses.

== See also ==
- List of prisons in Anhui
