= Wang Jishan =

Chinese military general and politician

Wang Jishan (王及善) (618 – August 28, 699), formally Duke Zhen of Xing (邢貞公), was a Chinese military general and politician of the Chinese Tang dynasty and Wu Zetian's Zhou dynasty, serving as a chancellor during Wu Zetian's reign.

== Background ==
Wang Jishan was born in 618, around the time of the founding of the Tang dynasty. His family was from Ming Prefecture (洺州, in modern Handan, Hebei). His father Wang Jun'e (王君愕) had, at the end of Tang's predecessor, the Sui dynasty, served under the agrarian rebel leader Wang Junkuo (王君廓), and after Tang was founded, surrendered to Tang with Wang Junkuo and subsequently served as a Tang general. Wang Jun'e participated in Emperor Taizong's campaign against Goguryeo and died in 645 during the Battle of Mount Zhubi (駐驆山). Emperor Taizong posthumously created him the Duke of Xing. After Wang Jun'e's death, Wang Jishan inherited the title of Duke of Xing and was given the additional honorific title of Chaosan Daifu (朝散大夫).

== During Emperor Gaozong's reign ==
During the reign of Emperor Taizong's son Emperor Gaozong, Wang Jishan served on the staff of his son and crown prince Li Hong. Once, Li Hong gathered his staff members for a gave of zhidao (擲倒, probably traversing on one's hands with feet in the air). When Wang's turn was up, he opined that there were people whose responsibilities were to entertain the crown prince, and that it was inappropriate for staff members to be participating in the game. Li Hong thanked him and excused him. When Emperor Gaozong heard this, he awarded Wang with silk and made him a commanding general of the imperial guards, commenting, "I know that you are faithful and diligent, and that is why I give you an office of the third rank. Other people need to be searched before they could enter the palace, but you are allowed to holster a large sword to be by my side. Do you understand the honor that this is?" Soon thereafter, however, Wang was dismissed on account of illness, but later on was made the minister of military supplies (衛尉卿, Weiwei Qing).

== During Emperor Ruizong's first reign ==
During the first reign of Emperor Gaozong's son Emperor Ruizong (Li Hong's younger brother, as Li Hong having predeceased Emperor Gaozong), with Emperor Gaozong's wife Empress Wu (later known as Wu Zetian) serving as empress dowager and regent, Wang Jishan served as the minister of imperial clan affairs (司屬卿, Sishu Qing). During a famine in the region east of the Taihang Mountains, Wang served as the coordinator of famine relief. He then successively served as the minister of rites (春官尚書, Chunguan Shangshu), the commandant at Qin Prefecture (秦州, roughly modern Tianshui, Gansu), and then the secretary general at Yi Prefecture (益州, roughly modern Chengdu, Sichuan). He eventually requested retirement on account of old age and illness.

== During Wu Zetian's reign ==
In 690, Empress Dowager Wu had Emperor Ruizong yield the throne to her, and she took the throne as "emperor," establishing a new Zhou dynasty and interrupting Tang. During a Khitan attack in 697, Wu Zetian requested Wang Jishan to come out of retirement to serve as the prefect of Hua Prefecture (滑州, roughly modern Anyang, Henan), stating to him, "The thieves on the border have rebelled. Even though you are ill, you can head slowly to your post 30 li a day [(i.e., 15 kilometers a day)]) with your wife and children. Even if you can only govern the prefecture while lying on your bed, you can cut off the Yellow River for me." She then inquired him as to his opinion on a number of central government affairs. He gave her some 10-odd items of opinion. She, in turn, responded, "A prefecture is unimportant compared to the important matters of the central government. You must not leave." She then made him Neishi (內史), the head of the legislative bureau of government (鳳閣, Fengge) and a post considered one for a chancellor. Later that year, when her secret police official Lai Junchen were accused of crimes warranting death and yet she considered pardoning Lai on account of his contributions to her in the past, Wang pointed out that Lai had falsely killed many virtuous officials and that he must be killed. Wu Zetian agreed and executed Lai.

In 698, the chancellor Di Renjie advocated that Wu Zetian recall Emperor Ruizong's older brother Li Zhe the Prince of Luling, himself a former emperor, from exile, an opinion that Wang Jishan and fellow chancellor Wang Fangqing shared. With her close advisor Ji Xu and her lovers Zhang Yizhi and Zhang Changzong advocating the same, she agreed and recalled Li Zhe, soon changing his name to Li Xian and making him crown prince. Later in 698, with rumors that Li Xian's crown prince position was not secure, Wang Jishan requested that Wu Zetian have Li Xian go to the central government buildings to meet with the officials, to quell the rumors, and she agreed.

It was said that Wang was not well-studied but was honest and upright in his acts. Around 699, at imperial feasts, Zhang Yizhi and Zhang Changzong were often not acting in accordance with proper regulations for imperial subjects, and Wang often counseled Wu Zetian not to allow them to carry out these actions. This displeased her, and she told Wang, "You are old. It is not right that you be required to attend so many feasts. From now on, just tend to the matters of the legislative bureau." Wang, in turn, claimed illness and requested sick leave. After taking leave for a month, Wu Zetian had not yet tried to see him. He sighed and stated, "How can the Son of Heaven not see someone as important as the head of the legislative bureau on a daily basis? This shows how unimportant I am viewed." He then requested retirement, but she did not approve of it. Instead, she made him Wenchang Zuo Xiang (文昌左相), one of the heads of the executive bureau (文昌臺, Wenchang Tai), and gave him the designation of Tong Fengge Luantai Sanpin (同鳳閣鸞臺三品), having him still serve as a chancellor de facto. He died a month later and was buried with honors, near the tomb of Emperor Gaozong, where Wu Zetian herself would eventually be buried as well.

== Notes and references ==
- Old Book of Tang, vol. 90.
- New Book of Tang, vol. 116.
- Zizhi Tongjian, vols. 202, 206.
