= Zhou Xing (secret police official) =

Chinese politician who was a secret police official

Zhou Xing (Chinese: 周興; died 691?) was a Chinese politician who was a secret police official of the Tang dynasty and the Wu Zhou dynasty. He was largely responsible for carrying out her actions to wipe out senior members of Tang's Li imperial clan, but, in a turnabout, was in 691 himself accused of crimes and, under threats of a torture technique himself developed, confessed. Wu Zetian spared his life and exiled him, but he was killed by his enemies on the way to exile.

== Background ==
It is not known when Zhou Xing was born, but it is known that he was from Chang'an County (長安), one of the two counties making up the Tang dynasty capital Chang'an. He studied law in his youth, and as of the reign of Emperor Gaozong of Tang, he was serving as the magistrate of Heyang County (河陽, in modern Jiaozuo, Henan). Zhou became known for his abilities and was summoned to the capital, as Emperor Gaozong was considering promoting him. However, someone submitted a letter to Emperor Gaozong, pointing out that Zhou had not passed imperial examinations, and Emperor Gaozong thereafter changed his idea about promoting Zhou. However, Zhou was not aware of this, and he repeatedly visited the government officials, awaiting a promotion. The chancellors said nothing to him, but eventually Wei Xuantong told him, "Magistrate Zhou, you may go." Zhou thereafter believed that Wei was the one who blocked his promotion and hated Wei immensely.

== As secret police official ==
Emperor Gaozong died in 683 and was succeeded by his son Li Zhe the Crown Prince (as Emperor Zhongzong), but Emperor Gaozong's powerful wife Empress Wu retained ruling powers as empress dowager and regent. In 684, when Emperor Zhongzong displayed signs of independence, she deposed him and replaced him with his younger brother Li Dan the Prince of Yu (as Emperor Ruizong), but thereafter wielded power even more firmly. She soon faced a rebellion against her led by Li Jingye the Duke of Ying, but quickly defeated the rebellion.

However, Li Jingye's rebellion caused Empress Dowager Wu to suspect many people of opposing her, and she began to encourage secret reports. Zhou had been serving as a low-level secretary (尚書都事, Shangshu Dushi) at the executive bureau of government (尚書省, Shangshu Sheng), and he became involved in serving as a secret police official for her, eventually promoted by her to be deputy minister of justice (秋官侍郎, Qiuguan Shilang). It was said that Zhou was involved in the deaths of thousands.

In 688, there was a false accusation by a slave of the official Hao Xiangxian (郝象賢) against Hao, whose deceased grandfather Hao Chujun had previously served as chancellor during Emperor Gaozong's reign and had opposed Emperor Gaozong's one-time plan, during his time of illness, to have Empress Wu serve as his regent. Empress Dowager Wu still bore grudges against Hao Chujun for that episode and took this opportunity to have Zhou investigate Hao Xiangxian. Zhou found Hao Xiangxian guilty and sentenced his entire family to death. (On the way to the execution field, Hao Xiangxian tried to flee and also loudly yelled out insults against Empress Dowager Wu and accusations that she was committing immoral acts; he was eventually killed by the guards, but as a result of what Hao Xiangxian did, thereafter until her death, whenever prisoners were to be executed, their mouths would be stuffed with wood so that they would not be able to yell out insults.)

Later in 688, in the aftermath of another failed rebellion, led by Emperor Gaozong's brother Li Zhen the Prince of Yue and Li Zhen's son Li Chong the Prince of Langye, Empress Dowager Wu considered wiping out the senior members of the imperial Li clan, and she put Zhou in charge of the plan. Zhou thereafter arrested Emperor Gaozong's uncles Li Yuanjia (李元嘉) the Prince of Han and Li Lingkui (李靈夔) the Prince of Lu, Li Yuanjia's son Li Zhuan (李譔) the Duke of Huang, and Emperor Gaozong's aunt Princess Changle and her husband Zhao Gui (趙瓌), brought them to the eastern capital Luoyang, and forced them to commit suicide. He then further massacred the princes' family and friends.

In 689, still bearing grudges against Wei Xuantong, who was a friend of Pei Yan, a chancellor that Empress Dowager Wu had executed in 684 on suspicions that he opposed her, Zhou falsely accused Wei of having said, "The empress dowager is old. It is better to support the emperor, for he will last longer." In anger, Empress Dowager Wu ordered Wei to commit suicide. Zhou also falsely accused the general Heichi Changzhi the Duke of Yan of treason, and Heichi was strangled to death.

In 690, Zhou suggested that the Li clan members be stripped of imperial clan status, and Empress Dowager Wu did so. He also falsely accused the chancellor Wei Fangzhi, who was subsequently exiled and executed in exile. Then, at the instigation of Empress Dowager Wu's powerful nephew Wu Chengsi, he accused Emperor Gaozong's sons by concubines, Li Shangjin (李上金) the Prince of Ze and Li Sujie the Prince of Xu of treason. Li Sujie was strangled, while Li Shangjin committed suicide.

Later in 690, Emperor Ruizong yielded the throne to Empress Dowager Wu, and she took the throne as "emperor" of a new Zhou dynasty, interrupting Tang dynasty. Yet later that year, the prefectural prefect Li Xingbao (李行褒) and his brothers were falsely accused and sentenced to have their clan executed. A subordinate of Zhou's at the ministry of justice, Xu Yougong (徐有功) tried to get the judgment reversed but was not able to. However, Zhou then accused Xu of acting on behalf of treasonous individuals and requested that Xu be executed. Wu Zetian refused to execute Xu, but for a time relieved Xu of his duties.

== Death ==
In 691, however, a famous incident involving Zhou Xing and a fellow secret police official Lai Junchen would lead to Zhou's downfall. Earlier that year, general Qiu Shenji (丘神勣) had been accused of a crime and executed, and subsequently, there were secret reports that Zhou was involved with Qiu's crimes. Wu Zetian had Lai investigate, without Zhou's knowledge. One day, Lai and Zhou sat down to lunch, and Lai asked Zhou the question, "Many of the accused are not willing to confess. Do you have an idea of how to get them to confess?" Zhou responded, "That is easy. Take a big urn and set a fire under it. Put the accused in it, and surely he will confess everything." Lai had a big urn brought and a fire set underneath, in accordance with Zhou's instructions, and then rose and stated to Zhou, "I had received secret instructions from Her Imperial Majesty with regard to you, big brother. Please enter the urn." Zhou, in fear, knelt and confessed. Wu Zetian did not execute Zhou but exiled him, and on the way to his place of exile, Zhou was killed by his enemies. (This incident inspired the Chinese proverb "invite the gentleman into the urn" (請君入甕, qing jun ru weng), now used for the concept of putting a person into a trap that he himself or she herself had set.)

== Notes and references ==
- Old Book of Tang, vol. 186, part 1.
- New Book of Tang, vol. 209.
- Zizhi Tongjian, vols. 203, 204.
