= Jiulong Prison =

Prison in Anhui, China

Jiulong Prison is a prison in Jiulong, Anhui, China, set in 120 acres (0.49 km^{2}). During the 1983 "Strike Hard" campaign the prison managed the Woyang County Cement Factory under the Fuyang Area Bureau of Justice. In 1995, its name was changed to Fuyang City Longshan Prison. On August 26, 2004, after Fuyang and Haozhou were divided into separate administrative areas it moved from Longshan town, Woyang County to its present location and changed to its present name. It holds inmates serving sentences of 5 years or less from Fuyang's 5 counties and 3 districts.

== See also ==
- List of prisons in Anhui
