= Xian Prefecture =

Historical administrative division in Shanxi, China

Xianzhou or Xian Prefecture (憲州) was a zhou (prefecture) in imperial China in modern Shanxi, China. It existed (intermittently) from 859 to 1151.

== Geography ==
The administrative region of Xianzhou in the Tang dynasty is in modern central Shanxi. It probably includes parts of modern:

- Under the administration of Taiyuan:
  - Loufan County
- Under the administration of Xinzhou:
  - Jingle County
