= Ge Fuyuan =

Chinese politician of the Tang dynasty and Zhou dynasty

Ge Fuyuan (格輔元; died November 7, 691) was a Chinese politician of the Tang dynasty and Wu Zetian's Zhou dynasty, serving briefly as a chancellor during Wu Zetian's reign.

It is not known when Ge Fuyuan was born, but it is known that he was from Bian Prefecture (汴州, roughly modern Kaifeng, Henan). Nothing is known about his father Ge Churen (格處仁), but his uncle Ge Deren (格德仁) was known for scholarship during Tang's predecessor Sui dynasty. Ge Fuyuan's brother Ge Xiyuan (格希元) served on the staff of Wu Zetian's son Li Xian and participated in Li Xian's project to write commentaries for the Book of Later Han.

Ge Fuyuan passed the imperial examination when he was young, and served in successively higher offices. As of 691, when Wu Zetian had already claimed the title of "emperor," establishing Zhou and interrupting Tang, Ge was serving as the imperial censor in charge of reviewing central government affairs (左肅政大夫, Zuo Suzheng Daifu) when Wu Zetian made him the minister of finance (地官尚書, Diguan Shangshu) and gave him the designation of Tong Fengge Luantai Pingzhangshi (同鳳閣鸞臺平章事), making him a chancellor de facto.

Just four months later, however, Ge offended Wu Zetian, as there had been a movement led by one Wang Qingzhi (王慶之) to have Wu Zetian's nephew Wu Chengsi made crown prince, displacing Wu Zetian's son Li Dan (formerly emperor until Wu Zetian took the throne in 690). Ge's senior colleague Cen Changqian opposed the movement and advocated that Wang's group of petitioners be disbanded, and Ge supported Cen. In late 691, Ge, Cen, and another chancellor Ouyang Tong were arrested by Wu Zetian's secret police official Lai Junchen and executed.

== Notes and references ==
- Old Book of Tang, vol. 70.
- New Book of Tang, vol. 102.
- Zizhi Tongjian, vol. 204.
