= Suzhou Prison =

Prison in China

Suzhou Prison is a prison in Suzhou, Jiangsu, China. In spring 1950, the Suxian Prefectural Commissioner's Office established the Sucheng LGB at present location. In 1956, it expanded to become the "Anhui Province No. 3 Prison" and on January 1, 1996, formally took on its current name. Primarily houses serious male offenders but began housing female prisoners in 1969. Currently has 350 employees. Huateng Garment Dyeing Ltd. is Anhui's largest producer of colored cloth.

The prison is the setting for several scenes in the 2001 movie Spy Game.

== See also ==
- List of prisons in Jiangsu
