= Pei Xingben =

Pei Xingben (裴行本) was a Chinese politician of Wu Zetian's Zhou dynasty, serving briefly as chancellor.

Despite Pei's high status, little is firmly established about his background or career except for the time that he served as chancellor—as, unusual for a chancellor, he did not have a biography in either the Old Book of Tang or the New Book of Tang. It is known that his grandfather Pei Xian (裴獻) served as a provincial governor during Tang dynasty's predecessor dynasty Sui dynasty and carried the title of Duke of Linfen, but nothing is known about his father Pei Yishan (裴義山) except the name.

As of 691, Pei Xingben was serving as the deputy minister of public works (冬官侍郎, Donguan Shilang), when Wu Zetian gave him the designation Tong Fengge Luantai Pingzhangshi (同鳳閣鸞臺平章事), making him a chancellor de facto. In 692, he, along with fellow chancellors Ren Zhigu and Di Renjie and other officials Cui Xuanli (崔宣禮), Lu Xian (盧獻), Wei Yuanzhong, and Li Sizhen (李嗣真), were accused of treason by Wu Zetian's secret police official Lai Junchen. Eventually, they escaped death when Di was able to hide a secret petition inside clothes that his family members took back home and was able to persuade Wu Zetian that they were not plotting treason. However, they were still exiled—in Pei's case, stripped of official status and exiled to the Lingnan region. There was no further reference in history about him, and it is not known when he died. (Lai tried to specifically argue that Pei's alleged crimes were particularly severe and if the other six were not to be executed, at least Pei should, but Wu Zetian, following the recommendation of Xu Yougong (徐有功), did not kill Pei.)

== Notes and references ==
- Zizhi Tongjian, vols. 204, 205.
