= Ren Zhigu =

Ren Zhigu (任知古) was a Chinese politician of Wu Zetian's Zhou Dynasty, serving briefly as chancellor.

Despite Ren's high status, little is firmly established about his background or career except for the time that he served as chancellor—as, unusual for a chancellor, he did not have a biography in either the Old Book of Tang or the New Book of Tang. He was not even listed as a chancellor in the table of the chancellors' family tree, among the Rens.

As of 691, Ren was serving as Fengge Shilang (鳳閣侍郎), the deputy head of the legislative bureau of government (鳳閣, Fengge), when Wu Zetian gave him the designation Tong Fengge Luantai Pingzhangshi (同鳳閣鸞臺平章事), making him a chancellor de facto. In 692, he, along with fellow chancellors Di Renjie and Pei Xingben and other officials Cui Xuanli (崔宣禮), Lu Xian (盧獻), Wei Yuanzhong, and Li Sizhen (李嗣真), were accused of treason by Wu Zetian's secret police official Lai Junchen. Eventually, they escaped death when Di was able to hide a secret petition inside clothes that his family members took back home and was able to persuade Wu Zetian that they were not plotting treason. However, they were still exiled—in Ren's case, he was demoted to be the magistrate of Jiangxia County (江夏, in modern Wuhan, Hubei). There was no further reference in history about him, and it is not known when he died.

== Notes and references ==
- Zizhi Tongjian, vols. 204, 205.
