= Li Chong (Tang dynasty) =

Chinese prince (died 688)

Li Chong (李沖) (died September 22, 688), formally the Prince of Langye (琅邪王), posthumously known during Wu Zetian's reign as Hui Chong (虺沖), was an imperial prince of the Chinese Tang dynasty. Along with his father Li Zhen, Li Chong rose against Wu Zetian, then empress dowager and regent, as they feared that she was about to slaughter the Tang imperial Li clan. Both he and Li Zhen were quickly defeated, however, and Li Chong was killed in battle.

== Background ==
It is not known when Li Chong was born. He was the oldest son of Li Zhen the Prince of Yue, a son of Emperor Taizong. It was not known when he was crowned the Prince of Langye, but it is known that he had successively served as prefects of Mi Prefecture, Ji (濟州, in modern Liaocheng, Shandong), and Bo (博州, also in modern Liaocheng) Prefectures, and was known for being capable. It was also said that he liked literature and was good at horsemanship and archery.

== Intrigue ==
Li Chong's uncle Emperor Gaozong died in 683 and was succeeded by his son Li Zhe (as Emperor Zhongzong), but real power was in the hands of Emperor Gaozong's powerful wife Empress Wu (later known as Wu Zetian). She took power as empress dowager and regent. In spring 684, when Emperor Zhongzong showed signs of independence, she deposed him and replaced him with his brother Li Dan the Prince of Yu, but thereafter held onto power even more tightly. She also gradually elevated the statuses of not only herself but also her Wu clan members, both past and present. This led members of the imperial Li clan to suspect that she planned slaughter them, overthrow the Tang dynasty, and replace it with her own.

== Rebellion against Empress Dowager Wu ==
The Li clan members who were suspecting that Empress Dowager Wu was planning to slaughter them included Li Chong; his father Li Zhen; his granduncles (sons of the dynasty founder Emperor Gaozu) Li Yuanjia (李元嘉) the Prince of Han, Li Yuangui (李元軌) the Prince of Huo, and Li Lingkui (李靈夔) the Prince of Lu; Li Yuanjia's son Li Zhuan (李譔) the Duke of Huang; Li Yuangui's son Li Xu (李緒) the Prince of Jiangdu; Li Lingkui's son Li Ai (李藹) the Prince of Fanyang; and another cousin of Li Zhen's, Li Rong (李融) the Prince of Dongwan. They secretly corresponded with each other, seeking one common plan to disarm Empress Dowager Wu. They became heavily alarmed when Empress Dowager Wu, after she had finished constructing a grand imperial hall, the Mingtang (明堂), issued orders to summon members of the imperial clan to the eastern capital Luoyang to be ready for a ceremony to worship the deity of the Luo River (洛水, near Luoyang).

== House arrest ==
The princes began to prepare to act, and in preparation, Li Zhuan forged an edict from Emperor Ruizong to Li Chong, stating, "I am under house arrest. The princes should come save me!" Li Chong also forced an edict from Emperor Ruizong to himself, stating, "The Empress Dowager is planning to transfer the sovereignty of the Li clan to the Wu clan!"

== Bo Prefecture ==
However, prior to the princes' working out a coordinated plan, on September 16, 688, Li Chong launched a rebellion himself at Bo Prefecture (博州, roughly modern Liaocheng, Shandong), where he was serving as prefect. He notified Li Yuanjia, Li Yuangui, Li Lingkui, Li Zhen, and Li Shen (李慎) the Prince of Ji (Li Zhen's brother) and asked them to rise as well, but only Li Zhen did, as the other princes, not fully prepared, were hesitant to do so.

== Attacks ==
When Empress Dowager Wu heard of Li Chong's rebellion, she commissioned the general Qiu Shenji (丘神勣) to attack Li Chong. Meanwhile, Li Chong gathered some 5,000 men and was preparing to attack Ji Prefecture. In preparation, he first attacked Wushui (武水, also in modern Liaocheng). Guo Wuti (郭務悌), the magistrate of Wushui County, fled to Wei Prefecture (魏州, roughly modern Handan, Hebei) to seek aid, and one of Wei Prefecture's county magistrates, Ma Xuansu (馬玄素) the magistrate of Shen County (莘縣, also in modern Liaocheng), took 1,700 men, initially intending to confront Li Chong, but then felt that he had insufficient strength, and so entered Wushui to defend it. Li Chong took up position south of Wushui and placed wagons filled with straw near Wushui's south gate, preparing to set it aflame so he could charge in, but as soon as he ignited the fire, the wind shifted from the south to the north, instead cutting off Li Chong's attack. Meanwhile, one of Li Chong's officers, Dong Xuanji (董玄寂), started telling his colleagues that Li Chong was committing treason. Li Chong beheaded Dong, but this made the soldiers even more fearful, and they began to desert, to the point that Li Chong only had his servants and guards with him. He was forced to flee back to the capital of Bo Prefecture, and when he arrived there on September 22, he was killed by the guards of the city gate.

== After his death ==
After Li Chong's death, Qiu Shenji arrived at Bo Prefecture. The officials of the prefectural government, dressed in white mourning garments, exited the city to show submission, but Qiu nevertheless beheaded all of them.

Meanwhile, Li Chong's father Li Zhen was the only prince who rose in rebellion after Li Chong did, but he too was quickly defeated. After Li Chong's and Li Zhen's deaths, Empress Dowager Wu put one of her secret police officers, Zhou Xing, in charge of investigating, and under her direction, Zhou arrested Li Yuanjia, Li Lingkui, Li Zhuan, Princess Changle, and Zhao Gui, and forced them to commit suicide. Their family members were mostly slaughtered, while those who were not killed were excised from the imperial clan rolls and had their family names changed to Hui (虺), meaning "viper."

Empress Dowager Wu subsequently seized the throne from Emperor Ruizong in 690, interrupting Tang dynasty and establishing her own Zhou dynasty. In 705, she was in turn overthrown, and Emperor Zhongzong was restored to the throne. He posthumously restored Li Zhen's family name and imperial clan status, but not his titles, as the move was opposed by his cousin and trusted advisor Wu Sansi (his cousin on the Wu side of the family) and his concubine Consort Shangguan Wan'er. Only later, during the reign of Emperor Zhongzong's nephew Emperor Xuanzong (Emperor Ruizong's son), in 716, were Li Zhen and Li Chong reburied. They were also given posthumous honors.

== Notes and references ==
- Old Book of Tang, vol. 76.
- New Book of Tang, vol. 80.
- Zizhi Tongjian, vol. 204.
