= Lujiang County =

Lujiang 庐江县
- County
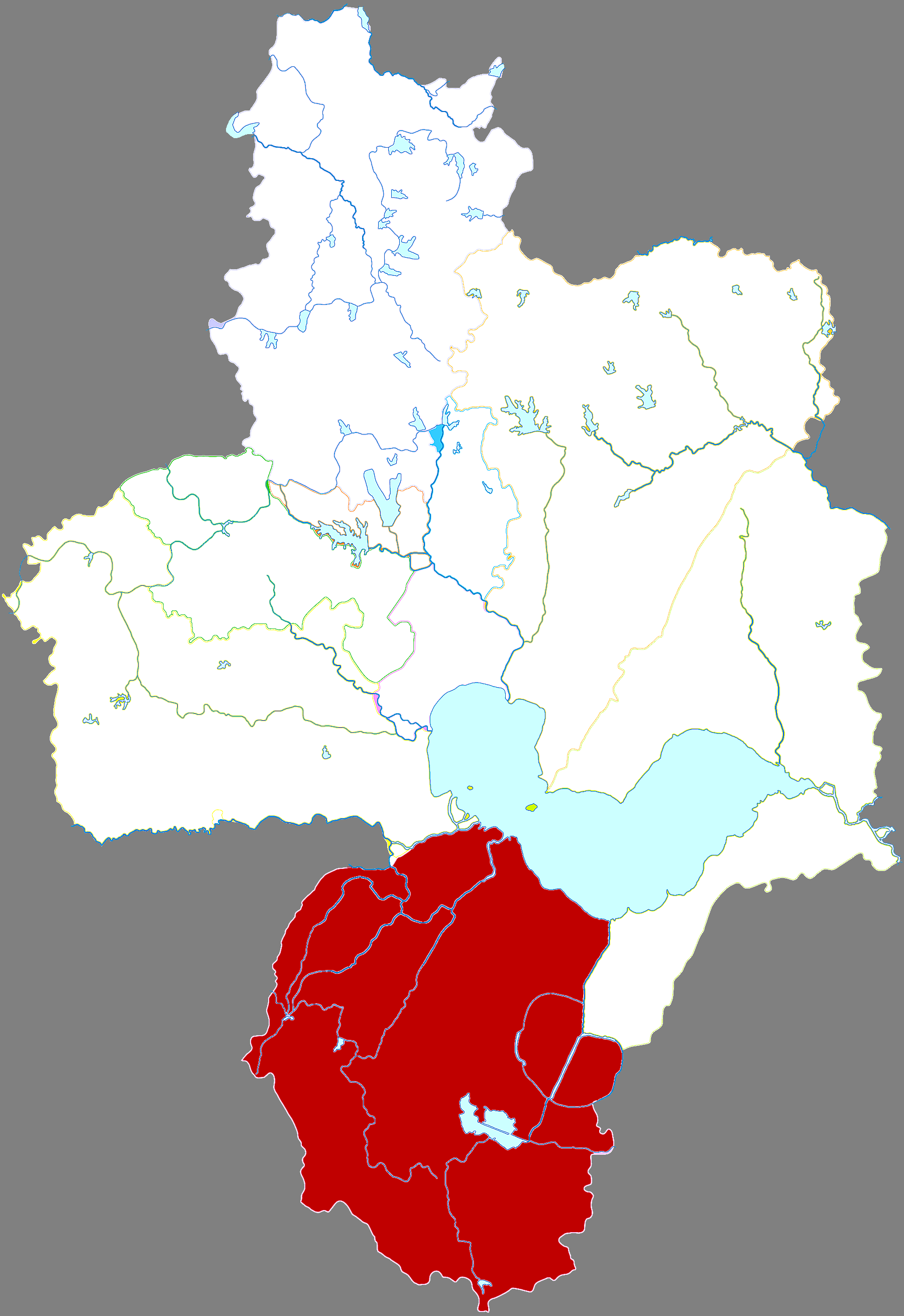
- Lujiang in Hefei

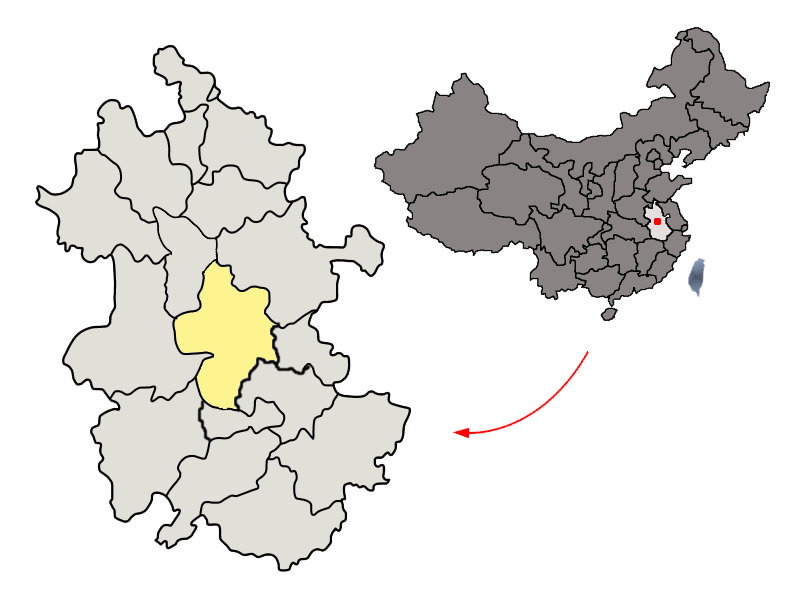
- Hefei in Anhui
- Coordinates: 31°15′20″N 117°17′16″E
- Country: China
- Province: Anhui
- Prefecture-level city: Hefei
- County seat: Lucheng

Area
  - Total: 2,343.7 km^{2} (904.9 sq mi)

Population (2020)
  - Total: 888,238
  - Density: 378.99/km^{2} (981.58/sq mi)
- Time zone: UTC+8 (China Standard)
- Postal code: 231500

Lujiang County (simplified Chinese: 庐江县; traditional Chinese: 廬江縣; pinyin: Lújiāng Xiàn) is a county of Anhui Province in East China. It is under the administration of the prefecture-level city of Hefei, the capital of Anhui. It is the southernmost county-level division of Hefei. Lujiang has a population of 888,238 as of November 2020 and covers an area of 2,343.7 km^{2} (904.9 sq mi). The county government is located in Lucheng Town.

Lujiang County has jurisdiction over 17 towns.

During the Spring and Autumn period, the Lujiang area was the location of the minor State of Shu (舒).

== History ==
Lujiang County used to be administered by the former prefecture-level city of Chaohu until August 2011, when Chaohu was dissolved and Lujiang, along with the former Juchao District (now the county-level Chaohu City), was incorporated into Hefei.

== Administrative divisions ==
Lujiang County is divided into 17 towns.

- Lucheng (庐城镇)
- Yefushan (冶父山镇)
- Tangchi (汤池镇)
- Wanshan (万山镇)
- Jinniu (金牛镇)
- Leqiao (乐桥镇)
- Guohe (郭河镇)
- Shitou (石头镇)
- Baishan (白山镇)
- Tongda (同大镇)
- Ketan (柯坦镇)
- Shengqiao (盛桥镇)
- Longqiao (龙桥镇)
- Baihu (白湖镇)
- Fanshan (矾山镇)
- Nihe (泥河镇)
- Luohe (罗河镇)

== Economy ==
Lujiang County is home to the Shaxi Copper Mine, operated by Tongling Nonferrous Metals Group. Although primarily a copper mine, it has become the largest gold-producing mine in China. In 2022, it produced approximately 958,740 ounces of gold, making it the leading single source of domestic gold output.

== Climate ==
Climate data for Lujiang, elevation 45 m (148 ft), (1991–2020 normals, extremes 1981–present)
Month	Jan	Feb	Mar	Apr	May	Jun	Jul	Aug	Sep	Oct	Nov	Dec	Year
Mean daily maximum °C (°F)	7.4 (45.3)	10.3 (50.5)	15.3 (59.5)	21.8 (71.2)	26.7 (80.1)	29.2 (84.6)	32.3 (90.1)	31.8 (89.2)	27.8 (82.0)	22.7 (72.9)	16.5 (61.7)	9.9 (49.8)	21.0 (69.7)
Daily mean °C (°F)	3.4 (38.1)	6.1 (43.0)	10.7 (51.3)	16.9 (62.4)	22.0 (71.6)	25.2 (77.4)	28.4 (83.1)	27.7 (81.9)	23.4 (74.1)	17.6 (63.7)	11.4 (52.5)	5.5 (41.9)	16.5 (61.8)
Mean daily minimum °C (°F)	0.4 (32.7)	2.7 (36.9)	7.0 (44.6)	12.8 (55.0)	18.0 (64.4)	21.9 (71.4)	25.2 (77.4)	24.7 (76.5)	20.0 (68.0)	13.8 (56.8)	7.5 (45.5)	2.0 (35.6)	13.0 (55.4)
Average precipitation mm (inches)	58.2 (2.29)	64.7 (2.55)	101.4 (3.99)	109.8 (4.32)	122.9 (4.84)	225.9 (8.89)	215.5 (8.48)	144.8 (5.70)	71.8 (2.83)	59.3 (2.33)	56.6 (2.23)	40.9 (1.61)	1,271.8 (50.06)
Source: China Meteorological Administration
