= Li Zhen (Tang dynasty) =

Tang dynasty prince (627–688)

Li Zhen (李貞; 627 – October 12, 688), formally Prince Jing of Yue (越敬王), posthumously known during Wu Zetian's reign as Hui Zhen (虺貞), was an imperial prince of the Chinese Tang dynasty who, along with his son Li Chong, rose against Wu Zetian, then empress dowager and regent, as they feared that she was about to slaughter the Tang imperial Li clan. Both he and Li Chong were quickly defeated, however, and he committed suicide.

== Background ==
Li Zhen was born on 627. He was the eighth son of Emperor Taizong. His mother was Emperor Taizong's concubine Consort Yan. Emperor Taizong created him the Prince of Han in 631. In 633, he was made the commandant at Xu Prefecture (徐州, roughly modern Xuzhou, Jiangsu), although it is unclear whether he actually reported to Xu Prefecture. In 636, his title was changed to Prince of Yuan and then to Prince of Yue, and he was made the commandant at Yang Prefecture (揚州, roughly modern Yangzhou, Jiangsu) – and this time, it appeared that he did report to Yang Prefecture. In 643, he was made the prefect of Xiang Prefecture (相州, roughly modern Handan, Hebei).

Emperor Taizong died in 649 and was succeeded by Li Zhen's younger brother Li Zhi (as Emperor Gaozong). In 653, Li Zhen was made the commandant at An Prefecture (安州, roughly modern Xiaogan, Hubei). Sometime during Emperor Gaozong's Xianheng era (670–674), he again became the prefect of Xiang Prefecture.

During these years, Li Zhen was said to be capable at horsemanship and archery, well-studied in literature and history, and capable in selecting officials. However, he was also said to be frequently listening to false accusations, and staff members who dared to speak against his actions were often dismissed. He further allowed his servants to bully the people he governed, and therefore, it was said that the people admired his talent but despised his actions.

== Rebellion against Empress Dowager Wu ==
Emperor Gaozong died in 683 and was succeeded by his son Li Zhe (as Emperor Zhongzong), but real power was in the hands of Emperor Gaozong's powerful wife Empress Wu (later known as Wu Zetian), who took power as empress dowager and regent. In spring 684, when Emperor Zhongzong showed signs of independence, she deposed him and replaced him with his brother Li Dan the Prince of Yu, but thereafter held onto power even more tightly. She also gradually elevated the statuses of not only herself but also her Wu clan members, both past and present, which led members of the imperial Li clan to suspect that she planned to overthrow the Tang dynasty and replace it with her own dynasty and that she was planning to slaughter them. Sometime during these times, Li Zhen was made the prefect of Yu Prefecture (豫州, roughly modern Zhumadian, Henan).

The Li clan members who were suspecting that Empress Dowager Wu was planning to slaughter them included Li Zhen, his uncles (sons of the dynasty founder Emperor Gaozu) Li Yuanjia (李元嘉) the Prince of Han, Li Yuangui (李元軌) the Prince of Huo, and Li Lingkui (李靈夔) the Prince of Lu; Li Yuanjia's son Li Zhuan (李譔) the Duke of Huang; Li Yuangui's son Li Xu (李緒) the Prince of Jiangdu; Li Lingkui's son Li Ai (李藹) the Prince of Fanyang; another cousin, Li Rong (李融) the Prince of Dongwan; and Li Zhen's son Li Chong the Prince of Langye. They secretly corresponded with each other, seeking one common plan to disarm Empress Dowager Wu. They became heavily alarmed when Empress Dowager Wu, after she had finished constructing a grand imperial hall, the Mingtang (明堂), issued orders to summon members of the imperial clan to the eastern capital Luoyang to be ready for a ceremony to worship the god of the Luo River (洛水, near Luoyang). The princes began to prepare to act, and in preparation, Li Zhuan forged an edict from Emperor Ruizong to Li Chong, stating, "I am under house arrest. The princes should come save me!" Li Chong also forced an edict from Emperor Ruizong to himself, stating, "The Empress Dowager is planning to transfer the sovereignty of the Li clan to the Wu clan!"

However, prior to the princes' working out a coordinated plan, on September 16, 688, Li Chong launched a rebellion himself at Bo Prefecture (博州, roughly modern Liaocheng, Shandong), where he was serving as prefect. He notified Li Yuanjia, Li Yuangui, Li Lingkui, Li Zhen, and Li Shen (李慎) the Prince of Ji (Li Zhen's brother) and asked them to rise as well, but only Li Zhen did, as the other princes, not fully prepared, were hesitant to do so. Li Zhen, in turn, notified his aunt the Princess Changle and her husband Zhao Gui (趙瓌) the prefect of Shou Prefecture (壽州, roughly modern Lu'an, Anhui), and both the Princess Changle and Zhao Gui encouraged him. However, of Li Zhen's subordinates, only Pei Shoude (裴守德) was of the same resolve as he was, and he gave Pei his daughter, the Lady Liangxiang, in marriage. Li Zhen then attacked and quickly captured Shangcai (上蔡, also in modern Zhumadian).

Empress Dowager Wu commissioned the chancellor Zhang Guangfu to serve as commander of an army against Li Zhen, assisted by the general Qu Chongyu (麴崇裕) and the chancellor Cen Changqian. Meanwhile, Li Chong was defeated and killed on September 22, 688, and when Li Zhen heard of Li Chong's death, he was terrified and considered surrendering and seeking forgiveness from Empress Dowager Wu. However, at this time, his subordinate Fu Yanqing (傅延慶) returned with 2,000 conscripts, and Li Zhen changed his mind, claiming to his army that Li Chong had been successful and would soon arrive. He also had his soldiers wear amulets blessed by Taoist and Buddhist monks that purportedly would protect them from swords.

Qu soon arrived with his army, and Li Zhen sent his youngest son Li Gui (李規) and Pei to resist Qu, but their forces deserted as soon as they saw Qu's forces. Li Gui and Pei fled back to the capital of Yu Prefecture. Li Zhen, in fear, tried to defend the city, but Qu's army quickly arrived. Li Zhen's bodyguards, while fighting off the attacking forces, told him, "Your Royal Highness should not wait to die by the sword." Li Zhen thereafter retreated into his mansion and committed suicide by poison. Li Gui strangled his mother and then hanged himself, and Pei and Lady Liangxiang did the same. Their heads were cut off and delivered to Luoyang to be shown to the public.

== After death ==
After Li Chong's and Li Zhen's deaths, Empress Dowager Wu put one of her secret police officers, Zhou Xing, in charge of investigating, and under her direction, Zhou arrested Li Yuanjia, Li Lingkui, Li Zhuan, Princess Changle, and Zhao Gui, and forced them to commit suicide. Their family members were mostly slaughtered, while those who were not killed were excised from the imperial clan rolls and had their family names changed to Hui (虺), meaning 'monster'. Of Li Zhen's remaining sons, Li Qian (李蒨) the Duke of Changshan was killed, while Li Wen (李溫) gave up names of his associates under interrogation and was spared, but was exiled to the Lingnan region.

Empress Dowager Wu subsequently seized the throne from Emperor Ruizong in 690, interrupting the Tang dynasty and establishing her own Zhou dynasty. In 705, she was in turn overthrown, and Emperor Zhongzong was restored to the throne. He posthumously restored Li Zhen's family name and imperial clan status, but not his titles, as the move was opposed by his cousin and trusted advisor Wu Sansi (his cousin on the Wu side of the family) and his concubine Consort Shangguan Wan'er. Only later, during the reign of Emperor Zhongzong's nephew Emperor Xuanzong (Emperor Ruizong's son), in 716, were Li Zhen and Li Chong reburied. They were also given posthumous honors, with Li Zhen receiving the posthumous name of Jing (meaning "undying faithfulness to the emperor").

== Family ==
- Father
  - Emperor Taizong of Tang
- Mother
  - Virtuous Consort, of the Yan clan (德妃 燕氏; 609–671)
- Issue and Descendants
  - Li Chong, Prince of Langye (琅邪王 李沖, ?–688), first son. Had one son:
    - Li Ji (李汲)
  - Li Qia (李洽), second son.
  - Li Wen, Duke of Shen (沈國公 李溫), third son.
  - Li Qian, Duke of Changshan (常山公 李蒨), fourth son.
  - Li Gui (李規), fifth son.
  - Li Zhenzi, Duke of Linghuai (臨淮公 李珍子), sixth son.

== Notes and references ==
- Old Book of Tang, vol. 76.
- New Book of Tang, vol. 80.
- Zizhi Tongjian, vols. 193, 194, 204.
