= Chaohu =

Chaohu 巢湖市
- County-level city
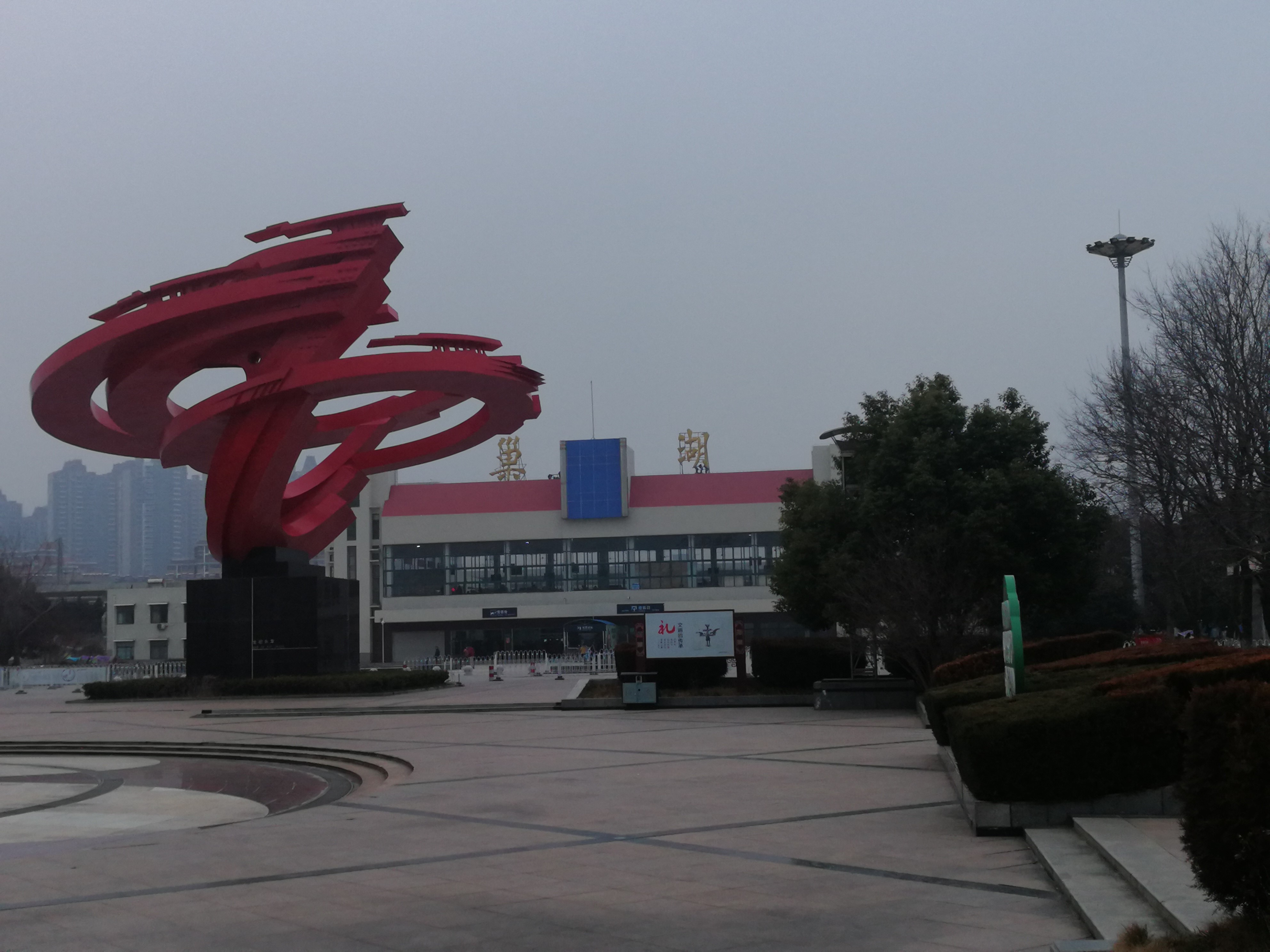
- Chaohu train station

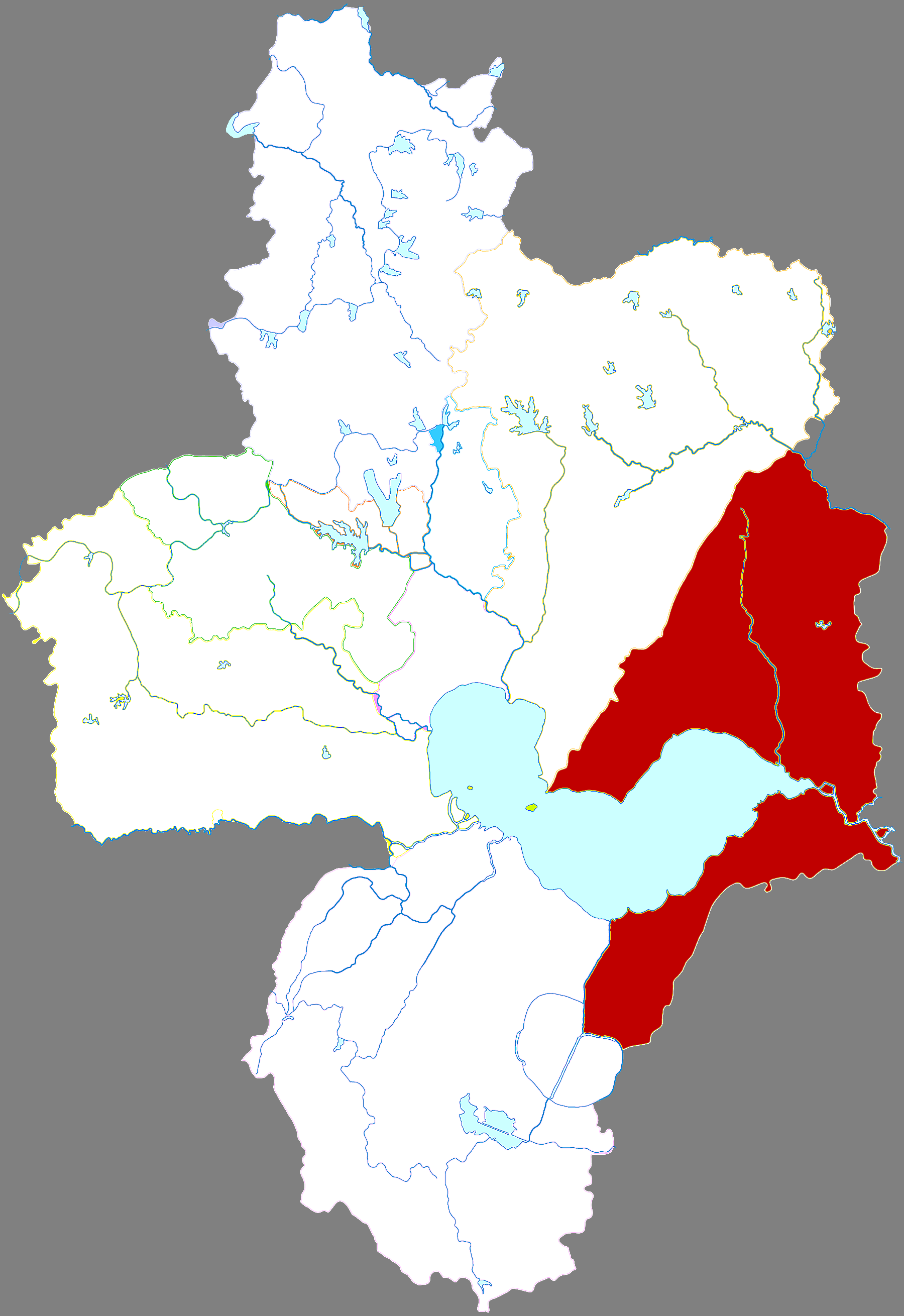
- Chaohu in Hefei

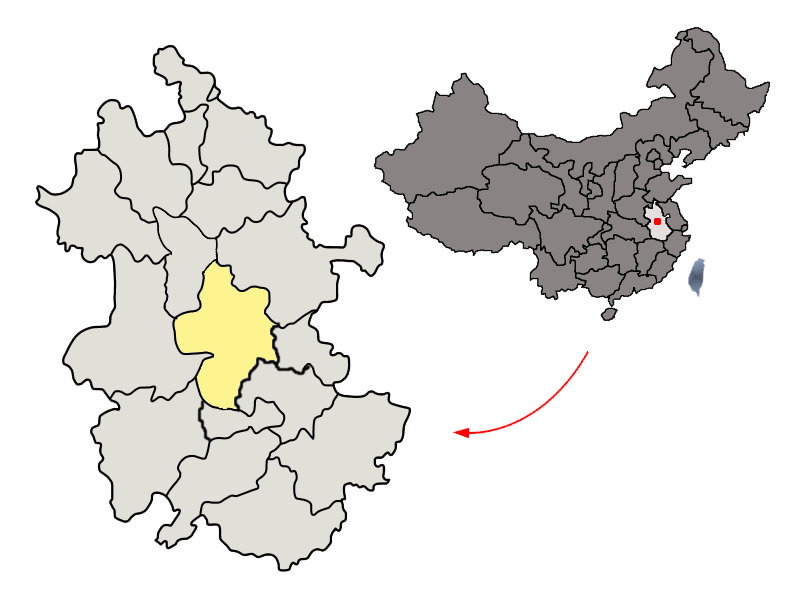
- Hefei in Anhui
- Coordinates (Chaohu municipal government): 31°37′28″N 117°53′25″E
- Country: China
- Province: Anhui
- Prefecture-level city: Hefei

Government
  - Mayor: Zhang Sheng (张生)
  - Secretary: Hu Qisheng (胡启生)

Area
  - Total: 2,063 km^{2} (797 sq mi)

Population (2020)
  - Total: 727,162
  - Density: 352.5/km^{2} (912.9/sq mi)
- Time zone: UTC+8 (CST)
- Postal code: 238000
- Area code: 0565 (abolished, now using 0551-8XXXXXXX)
- License Plate Prefix: 皖A (formerly 皖Q)

Chaohu (Chinese: 巢湖; pinyin: Cháohú) is a county-level city of Anhui Province, China. Situated on the northeast and southeast shores of Lake Chao, from which the city was named, Chaohu is under the administration of the prefecture-level city of Hefei, the provincial capital, and is the latter's easternmost county-level division.

== History ==
Formerly it was a prefecture-level city, which held administration over Wuwei, Lujiang, He and Hanshan counties until it dissolved on 2011 August 22. The Anhui provincial government announced in a controversial decision that the prefecture-level city Chaohu was to be split into three parts and absorbed into neighboring cities. Juchao District was renamed to Chaohu as a county-level city under Hefei's administration.

== Climate ==
Climate data for Chaohu, elevation 31 m (102 ft), (1991–2020 normals, extremes 1971–present)
Month	Jan	Feb	Mar	Apr	May	Jun	Jul	Aug	Sep	Oct	Nov	Dec	Year
Record high °C (°F)	21.4 (70.5)	27.7 (81.9)	33.9 (93.0)	33.8 (92.8)	35.8 (96.4)	37.7 (99.9)	39.3 (102.7)	40.1 (104.2)	38.3 (100.9)	33.5 (92.3)	29.5 (85.1)	24.0 (75.2)	40.1 (104.2)
Mean daily maximum °C (°F)	7.3 (45.1)	10.2 (50.4)	15.3 (59.5)	21.8 (71.2)	26.9 (80.4)	29.4 (84.9)	32.7 (90.9)	32.1 (89.8)	28.1 (82.6)	22.8 (73.0)	16.4 (61.5)	9.9 (49.8)	21.1 (69.9)
Daily mean °C (°F)	3.3 (37.9)	5.9 (42.6)	10.6 (51.1)	16.8 (62.2)	22.1 (71.8)	25.4 (77.7)	28.8 (83.8)	28.0 (82.4)	23.7 (74.7)	18.0 (64.4)	11.7 (53.1)	5.6 (42.1)	16.7 (62.0)
Mean daily minimum °C (°F)	0.4 (32.7)	2.6 (36.7)	6.8 (44.2)	12.5 (54.5)	17.9 (64.2)	22.0 (71.6)	25.6 (78.1)	25.0 (77.0)	20.4 (68.7)	14.4 (57.9)	8.1 (46.6)	2.3 (36.1)	13.2 (55.7)
Record low °C (°F)	−13.2 (8.2)	−11.7 (10.9)	−3.9 (25.0)	0.7 (33.3)	8.7 (47.7)	13.3 (55.9)	17.3 (63.1)	17.9 (64.2)	11.9 (53.4)	2.1 (35.8)	−4.1 (24.6)	−11.3 (11.7)	−13.2 (8.2)
Average precipitation mm (inches)	56.2 (2.21)	64.3 (2.53)	91.4 (3.60)	93.1 (3.67)	95.4 (3.76)	186.6 (7.35)	201.9 (7.95)	162.2 (6.39)	71.1 (2.80)	52.1 (2.05)	57.7 (2.27)	39.7 (1.56)	1,171.7 (46.14)
Average precipitation days (≥ 0.1 mm)	10.2	9.9	11.3	10.5	10.7	11.0	11.2	12.3	8.2	8.5	8.2	7.9	119.9
Average snowy days	4.2	2.4	1.0	0	0	0	0	0	0	0	0.4	1.3	9.3
Average relative humidity (%)	76	74	72	70	71	77	78	79	78	74	75	73	75
Mean monthly sunshine hours	110.5	116.3	143.7	174.1	181.3	151.9	198.8	187.9	153.6	157.6	140.5	131.9	1,848.1
Percentage possible sunshine	35	37	39	45	43	36	46	46	42	45	45	42	42
Source 1: China Meteorological Administration all-time extreme temperature all-time January high
Source 2: Weather China

== Administrative divisions ==
Chaohu City is divided to 6 subdistricts, 11 towns and 1 township.

Subdistricts

- Woniushan Subdistrict (卧牛山街道)
- Yafu Subdistrict (亚父街道)
- Tianhe Subdistrict (天河街道)
- Bantang Subdistrict (半汤街道)
- Fenghuangshan Subdistrict (凤凰山街道)
- Zhongmiao Subdistrict (中庙街道)

Towns

- Zhegao (柘皋镇)
- Tongyang (烔炀镇)
- Huanglu (黄麓镇)
- Huailin (槐林镇)
- Zhonghan (中垾镇)
- Sanbing (散兵镇)
- Suwan (苏湾镇)
- Xiage (夏阁镇)
- Bazhen (坝镇镇)
- Yinping (银屏镇)
- Langanji (栏杆集镇)

Townships

- Miaogang Township (庙岗乡)

== Landmarks ==
- Chaohu Stadium, a sports complex with a seagull-shaped building.

== Notable people ==
- Zhou Yu (175–210), Three Kingdoms era military general of the Kingdom of Wu
- Ding Ruchang (1836–1895), Qing Dynasty naval commander and captain of battleship Dingyuan
- Feng Yuxiang, warlord in the Republican Era
- Xu Haifeng (b. 1957), first Chinese gold medalist for Men's 50 m Pistol in the 1984 Summer Olympics held in Los Angeles
- Zhang Zhizhong, general in the National Revolutionary Army of the Republic of China.
