= 囝 (disambiguation) =

囝 is derived from Kangxi radical 31.

囝 may also refer to:

- in the Fuzhou dialect for "son"
- in the Zetian characters for "moon, month"
