= Wei Tuan'er =

Chinese courtier

Wei Tuan'er (韋團兒) (?-693) or Tuaner, was a Chinese courtier who was a female figure in the Wu and Zhou Dynasties. She was an official household maid who guarded the palace.

She was a favorite lady-in-waiting of Wu Zetian and instrumental in a plot which caused the downfall of Crown Princess Liu and Consort Dou, the wife and consort of former Emperor Ruizong of Tang.

== Biography ==
Tuaner was born on an unknown date. She served as an lady-in-waiting for Wu Zetian and was a contributor in a plot which caused the downfall of Empress Liu and Consort Dou, the wife and consort of former Emperor Ruizong of Tang. Dissatisfied with Li Dan, she had falsely accused Liu and Dou of cursing Emperor Wu Zetian with evil arts.

On the second day of the first month of the second year of longevity (November of the previous year of the summer calendar), Liu and Dou went to Jiayu Hall to see Wu Zetian. After withdrawing, they were killed at the same time and buried in the palace. No one knew where he was buried. Li Dan didn't dare to say anything about this matter. In front of his mother, his expression and movements were free.

Tuan'er wanted to frame Li Dan again. Someone told Wu Zetian about her situation, and Wu Zetian killed Tuan'er.
