= Wu Zetian =

Empress of China from 690 to 705

Wu Zetian 武則天
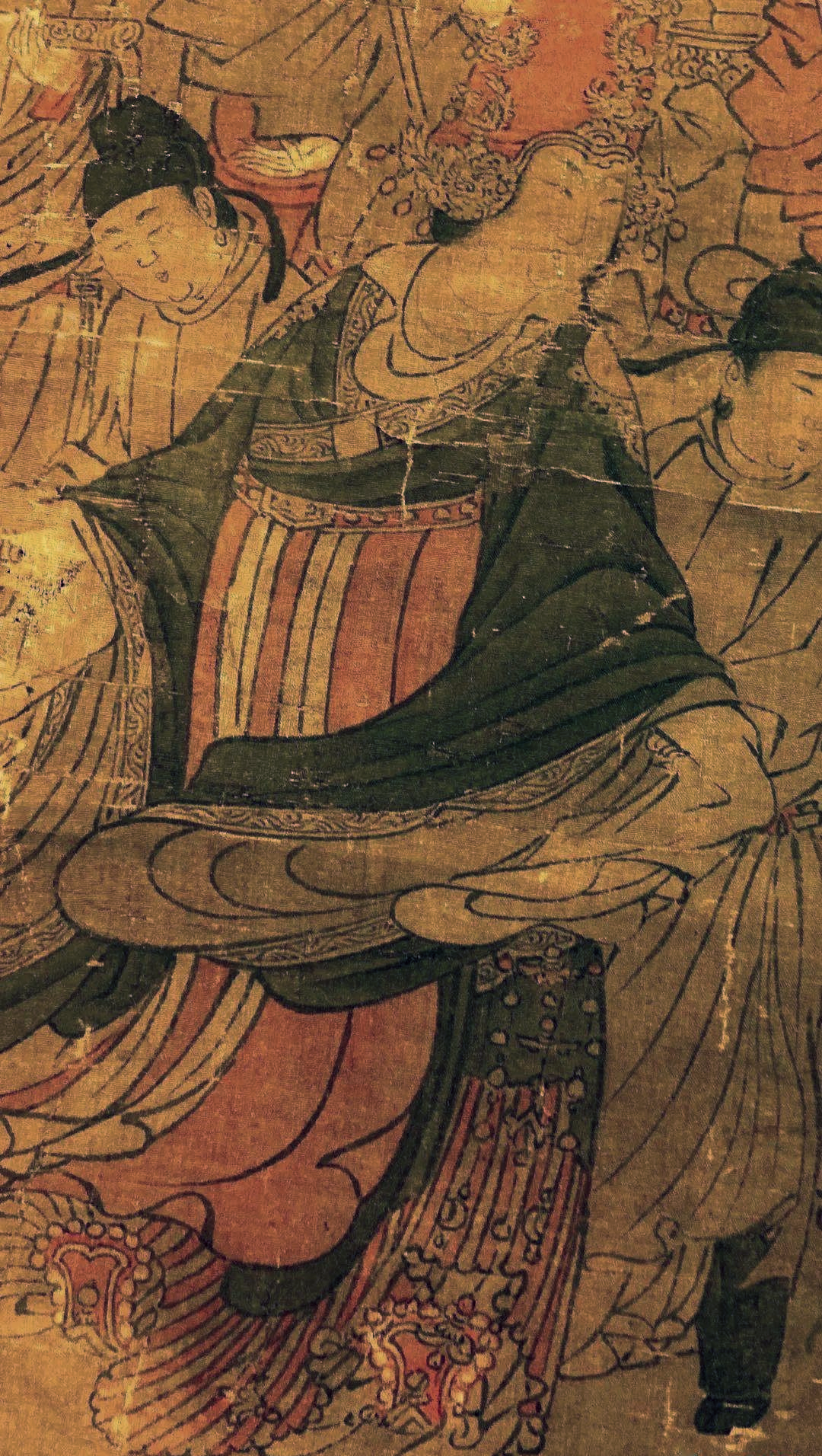
- Detail of an 8th-century silk painting depicting Wu Zhao, by Zhang Xuan (Note: The painting is recorded as Empress Wu's Procession (武后行从图) or Tang Empress' Procession (唐后行从图).)

Emperor of the Zhou dynasty
- Reign: 16 October 690 (Note: Wu returned to the palace in 650 as a concubine with the rank of "lady of bright deportment" (昭仪; zhāoyí), and was promoted even higher to the rank of "celestial consort" (宸妃, chén fēi) in early 655 (at least, according to the Old Book of Tang; the New Book of Tang recorded that due to opposition from Han Yuan and Lai Ji, Gaozong did not bestow this title to Wu.). Wu was later promoted to "empress" (皇后, huánghòu) in November 655. She later had partial power since c.660 as the "deputy emperor" (副皇, fù huáng) and her power was even more paramount after January 665, with her power almost equal to that of the emperor. After that, she and the emperor are addressed as the "Two Saints" (二聖, èr shèng), and they even performed the sacred and ancient ceremony of Feng Shan together at Mount Tai. Also, in October 674, she was addressed as "heavenly empress" (天后, tiān hòu), which completed the legitimacy of her joint rule with Emperor Gaozong, who was also addressed as "heavenly emperor" (天皇, tiān huáng). In March 675, Gaozong, incapacitated by the progress of his illness until his death, intended to cede power to Wu, who did not do so due to the opposition of the chancellors. In order to deal with this process and prevent the recurrence of such incidents, Wu associated with several mid-level officials who collectively became known as the "North Gate Scholars" (北門學士, běimén xuéshì). They thus act as a secret secretariat, "to process for the empress memorials addressed to the throne, and to make decisions on the policy which were properly the functions of the chancellors". Also, Gaozong left the decision-making authority for state affairs to Wu and their sons (Li Heng and Li Xian) and semi-retired himself, but Wu eliminated them in a power struggle. After Emperor Gaozong's death in 683, power fell completely and solely into her hands, who in turn installed and removed their younger sons Emperors Zhongzong and Ruizong, and did not allow them to rule. Her Wu Zhou dynasty was proclaimed on the 17th of October, 690, and she proclaimed herself emperor on 19 October, demoting her son Emperor Ruizong to the rank of crown prince with the unusual title of imperial successor (皇嗣, huángsì).) – 21 February 705 (Note: She lost power in the palace coup of 20 February 705. She abdicated the next day, and on 22 February she was forced to return imperial authority to her son Li Xian, who was restored as Emperor Zhongzong on 23 February. The Wu Zhou dynasty was terminated with the restoration of the Tang dynasty on 3 March 705.)
- Enthronement: 16 October 690
- Predecessor: Dynasty established (Ruizong as emperor of the Tang dynasty)
- Successor: Dynasty abolished (Zhongzong as emperor of the Tang dynasty)

Empress dowager of the Tang dynasty
- Tenure: 27 December 683 – 16 October 690
- Predecessor: None
- Successor: Empress Dowager Wei

Empress consort of the Tang dynasty
- Tenure: 22 November 655 – 27 December 683
- Predecessor: Empress Wang
- Successor: Empress Wei
- Born: 17 February 624; Lizhou
- Died: 16 December 705 (aged 81); Luoyang
- Burial: Qian Mausoleum
- Spouses: Emperor Taizong of Tang (m. 638; died 649); Emperor Gaozong of Tang (m. 650; died 683)
- Issue: Li Hong, Emperor Yizong of Tang; Princess Si of Anding; Li Xián, Crown Prince Zhanghuai; Li Xiǎn, Emperor Zhongzong of Tang; Li Dan, Emperor Ruizong of Tang; Princess Taiping
Names
- Family name: Wu (武); Given name: first, no record; later, Zhao (曌/瞾), possibly originally Zhao (照) (Note: Her cousin's son Zong Qinke created a number of new characters in December 689, and she chose 曌 as her given name, which became her taboo name when she ascended the throne the next year. Some sources assert that this character was actually written 瞾. Some sources (e.g., Bo Yang Edition of the Zizhi Tongjian, vols. 47–49) also assert that her original given name was Zhao and that in 689 she only changed the written character, but this is confirmed by neither the Old Book of Tang nor the New Book of Tang, neither of which stated her original given name. Her grandson Li Chongzhao, sometime after she became emperor, changed his name to Li Chongrun to observe naming taboo for her, and the character of "Zhao" in Li Chongzhao's name was 照. See Old Book of Tang, vol. 86 and New Book of Tang, vol. 81.); Art name: Mei (媚) (Note: She was given the name "Meiniang" by Emperor Taizong in the late 630s after she had entered the imperial palace.)
Regnal name
- Emperor Shengshen (聖神皇帝); Emperor Jinlun Shengshen (金輪聖神皇帝); Emperor Yuegu Jinlun Shengshen (越古金輪聖神皇帝); Emperor Cishi Yuegu Jinlun Shengshen (慈氏越古金輪聖神皇帝); Emperor Tiance Jinlun Shengshen (天冊金輪聖神皇帝); Emperor Zetian Dasheng (則天大聖皇帝)
Posthumous name
- Short: Empress Zetian (則天皇后) (Note: "Zetian" was the part of the honorific name "Emperor Zetian Dasheng" (則天大聖皇帝) given to her in February 705 by her son, Emperor Zhongzong of Tang. The honorific name was used as her posthumous name when she died ten months later, although she was also frequently referred to as "heavenly empress" (天后, tiān hòu) throughout the rest of the Tang dynasty.); Full: Empress Zetian Shunsheng (則天順聖皇后) (Note: The final version of her posthumous name as given in July 749.)
Temple name
- None (Note: The Wu Zhou dynasty was abolished before her death, and she was reverted to the rank of empress on her death, so she did not have a temple name, as empresses, unlike ruling emperors, were not given temple names.)
- House: Wu (by birth); Li (by marriage)
- Dynasty: Tang (by marriage); Zhou (by establishment)
- Father: Wu Shiyue
- Mother: Lady Yang
- Religion: Buddhism

Chinese name
- Traditional Chinese: 武則天
- Simplified Chinese: 武则天
Transcriptions
Standard Mandarin
- Hanyu Pinyin: Wǔ Zétiān
- Bopomofo: ㄨˇ ㄗㄜˊ ㄊㄧㄢ
- Gwoyeu Romatzyh: Wuu Tzertian
- Wade–Giles: Wu^{3} Tsê^{2}-tʻien^{1}
- Tongyong Pinyin: Wǔ Zétian
- IPA: [ù tsɤ̌.tʰjɛ́n]
other Mandarin
- Sichuanese Pinyin: Wu^{3} Ze^{2}tian^{1}
Wu
- Wugniu: ^{6}wu-tseq-thi
- Suzhounese: ^{6}vu-tseq-thie
Hakka
- Romanization: vu^{3} zed^{5} tian^{1}
- Pha̍k-fa-sṳ: Vú Chet-thiên
Yue: Cantonese
- Yale Romanization: Móuh Jāktīn
- Jyutping: Mou5 Zak1-tin1
- Canton Romanization: mou^{5} zeg^{1} tin^{1}
- Hong Kong Romanisation: Mo Tsak Tin
- Macau Romanization: Mou Chak Tin
- IPA: [mɔw˧ tsɐk̚˥.tʰin˥]
other Yue
- Taishanese: mu^{4} dak^{2} hen^{1}
Southern Min
- Hokkien POJ: Bú Chek-thian
- Tâi-lô: Bú Tsik-thian
- Teochew Peng'im: Bhu^{2} Zêg^{4}-tiêng^{1}
Eastern Min
- Fuzhou BUC: Ũ Cáik-tiěng
Middle Chinese
- Middle Chinese: Mɨo^{X} Tsək-then

Emperor Zetian (17 February 624 (Note: The birth year given here is deduced from the age at death given in the New Book of Tang, compiled in 1045–1060, which is the date favored by modern historians. The year of birth deduced from the age at death in the Old Book of Tang, compiled in 941–945, is 623. The year of birth deducted from the age at death and the age when she entered the palace, in the Zizhi Tongjian, compiled in 1065–84, is 17 February 624. Compare New Book of Tang, vol. 4 with Old Book of Tang, vol. 6 and Zizhi Tongjian 1084, vols. 195, 208) (Note: General note: Dates given here are in the Julian calendar. They are not in the proleptic Gregorian calendar.) – 16 December 705 AD), personal name Wu Zhao, was the sole emperor of the self-styled Zhou dynasty from 690 to 705. She was the only undisputed female sovereign in the history of China. She had previously held power as the empress consort of Emperor Gaozong of the Tang dynasty from 660 to 683 and as empress dowager during the reigns of her sons, Emperors Zhongzong and Ruizong, between 683 and 690.

In her early life, Wu served as a concubine of Emperor Taizong. After his death, she married his successor, Emperor Gaozong, becoming empress in 655. Wu exercised substantial political influence even before her elevation and gradually came to dominate court affairs. After Gaozong suffered a debilitating stroke in 660, she effectively administered the empire on his behalf until his death in 683. Breaking with precedent, Wu then consolidated power and prevented her sons from ruling. In 690, she proclaimed the Zhou dynasty in place of the Tang and crowned herself emperor.

During her 45-year de facto rule over China, Wu institutionalized the use of informants and enforced stringent legal measures, purged members of the Tang royal house and veteran officials from earlier administrations, reformed the civil service system to promote merit, patronized Buddhism as well as literature and the arts, and conducted military campaigns against Turkic and Tibetan incursions. Her rule formed part of the High Tang period, a historic peak in China's political power and cultural influence. In her later years, her governance became increasingly autocratic and extravagant. She was removed from power in the Shenlong Coup, which abolished the Zhou dynasty and restored the Tang, and she died a few months later.

== Names and titles ==
In Chinese history and literature, Wu Zetian (Mandarin pronunciation: [ù tsɤ̌.tʰjɛ́n]) was known by various names and titles. Mention of her in the English language has only increased their number. A difficulty in English translations is that they tend to specify gender (as in the case of "emperor" versus "empress" or "prince" versus "princess"), whereas, in Classical Chinese, words such as hou (后, "sovereign", "prince", "queen") or huangdi (皇帝, "imperial supreme ruler", "royal deity") are of grammatically indeterminate gender.

=== Names ===
In Wu's time, women's birth names were rarely recorded. She changed her name to Wu Zhao after rising to power, often written as 武曌 (曌 has also been written as 瞾 on occasion, and both are derivatives of 照, which may be her original name, with 瞾 being one of the characters invented by Wu). Wu was her patronymic surname, which she retained, according to traditional Chinese practice, after marriage to Gaozong, of the Li family. Emperor Taizong gave her the art name Wu Mei (武媚), meaning "glamorous". Thus, Chinese people often refer to her as Wu Mei or Wu Meiniang (武媚娘) when they write about her youth, as Wu Hou (武后) when referring to her as empress consort and empress dowager, and as Wu Zetian (武則天) as her posthumous title, given only after her death.

Because her family name, Wu (武), is a homophone for the second character in 'parrot' (鹦鹉), there are many stories and jokes that make use of imagery of a parrot to communicate about Wu and her clan. In particular, Emperor Gaozong's family name, Li (李), is a homophone with a type of cat 狸貓 (raccoon) – so a story circulated about a cat eating a parrot at court.

=== Titles ===
During her life, and posthumously, Wu was awarded various official titles. Both hou (后) and huangdi (皇帝) are titles (modifications, or added characters to hou are of lesser importance). Born Wu Zhao, she is not properly known as "Wu Hou" (Empress Wu) until receiving this title in 655, nor is she properly known as "Wu Zetian", her regnal name, until 690, when she took the title huangdi.

Legend:

- Tang dynasty (唐朝, 618–907)
- Zhou dynasty (周朝, 690–705, ruled by Wu Zetian)

Titles and honorifics held by Wu Zetian throughout her life and posthumous recognition
| Period (with reign years) | Year Declared | Title (Pinyin) | Literal Translation | Title | Notes |
|---|---|---|---|---|---|
| Reign of Emperor Gaozu of Tang (618–626) | 624 | Furen | Lady | 夫人 | Early consort title during Emperor Gaozu’s reign. |
| Reign of Emperor Taizong of Tang (626–649) | 637 | Cairen | Lady of Talent | 才人 | One of the nine 5th-ranking consorts under Taizong. |
| Reign of Emperor Gaozong of Tang (649–683) | 650 | Zhaoyi | Lady of Bright Deportment | 昭儀 | One of the nine 3rd-ranking consorts (嬪; pín); marked her rise in the inner palace. |
| Reign of Emperor Gaozong of Tang (649–683) | 655 | Huanghou | Empress | 皇后 | Officially became Empress of Emperor Gaozong. |
| Reign of Emperor Gaozong of Tang (649–683) | 674 | Tianhou | Heavenly Empress | 天后 | Elevated to a divine-associated title. |
| Reign of Emperor Zhongzong of Tang (684) | 683 | Wu Huang Taihou | Empress Dowager Wu | 武皇太后 | Ruled as regent following Gaozong’s death. |
| Reign of Emperor Ruizong of Tang (684–690) | 684 | Wu Huang Taihou | Empress Dowager Wu | 武皇太后 | Continued regency; de facto ruler. |
| Reign as Empress Regnant of Zhou dynasty (690–705) | 690 | Shengshen Huangdi | Holy Divine Emperor | 聖神皇帝 | Declared herself Emperor of Zhou. |
| Reign as Empress Regnant of Zhou dynasty (690–705) | 693 | Jinlun Shengshen Huangdi | Golden Wheel Holy Emperor | 金輪聖神皇帝 | Added “Golden Wheel” (Buddhist cosmology reference). |
| Reign as Empress Regnant of Zhou dynasty (690–705) | 694 | Yue Gu Jinlun Shengshen Huangdi | Past-Surpassing Golden Wheel Holy Emperor | 越古金輪聖神皇帝 | Title emphasizing surpassing antiquity. |
| Reign as Empress Regnant of Zhou dynasty (690–705) | 695 | Jinlun Shengshen Huangdi | Golden Wheel Holy Emperor | 金輪聖神皇帝 | Reaffirmed imperial divinity. |
| Reign as Empress Regnant of Zhou dynasty (690–705) | 695 | Tiance Jinlun Dadi | Heaven-Ordained Golden Wheel Emperor | 天策金輪大帝 | Linked to her ruling institution “Tiance Fu.” |
| Reign as Empress Regnant of Zhou dynasty (690–705) | 705 | Zetian Dasheng Huangdi | Heaven-Following Great Holy Emperor | 則天大聖皇帝 | Final Zhou title before Tang restoration. |
| Second reign of Emperor Zhongzong of Tang (705–710) | 705 | Zetian Dasheng Huanghou | Heaven-following Great Holy Empress | 則天大聖皇后 | Posthumous-like recognition under restored Tang. |
| Second reign of Emperor Ruizong of Tang (710–712) | 710 | Tianhou | Heavenly Empress | 天后 | Honored title after abdication. |
| Second reign of Emperor Ruizong of Tang (710–712) | 710 | Dasheng Tianhou | Great Holy Heavenly Empress | 大聖天后 | Further sanctified epithet. |
| Second reign of Emperor Ruizong of Tang (710–712) | 712 | Tianhou Shengdi | Heavenly Empress Holy Emperor | 天后聖帝 | Combination of imperial and divine status. |
| Second reign of Emperor Ruizong of Tang (710–712) | 712 | Shenghou | Holy Empress | 聖后 | Final honorary style of late years. |
| Reign of Emperor Xuanzong of Tang (713–756) | 716 | Zetian Huanghou | Heaven-Following Empress | 則天皇后 | Restored Tang posthumous recognition. |
| Reign of Emperor Xuanzong of Tang (713–756) | 749 | Zetian Shun Sheng Huanghou | Heaven-Following Holiness-Abiding Empress | 則天順聖皇后 | Full temple-style posthumous title granted by Xuanzong. |

=== "Empress" ===
Various Chinese titles have been translated into English as "empress", including "empress" in both the sense of empress consort and empress regnant. Generally, the monarch was male and his chief spouse was given a title such as huanghou (皇后), often translated as "empress" or more specifically "empress consort". Upon the emperor's death, the surviving empress consort could become empress dowager, sometimes wielding considerable political power as regent during the minority of the (male) heir to the position of emperor.

Since the time of Qin Shi Huang (259–210 BC), the Emperor of China using the title huangdi (皇帝, translated as "emperor" or "empress (regnant)" as appropriate), Wu was the only woman in the history of China to assume the title huangdi. Her tenure as de facto ruler of China and official regent of the Tang dynasty (first through her husband and then through her sons, from 665 to 690) was not without precedent in Chinese history, but she broke precedent when she founded her own dynasty in 690, the Zhou (周) (interrupting the Tang dynasty), ruling personally under the name Sacred and Divine Huangdi (聖神皇帝), and variations thereof, from 690 to 705.

Wu Zetian and Empress Dowager Liu of the Song dynasty are said to be the only women in Chinese history to have worn a yellow robe, ordinarily reserved for the emperor's sole use, as a monarch or co-ruler in their own right.

== Background and early life ==
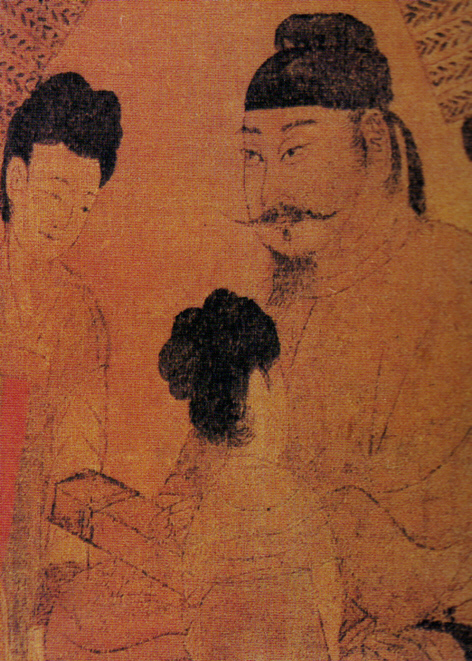
A painting portraying Emperor Taizong of Tang by painter Yan Liben (c. 600–673)

The Wu family clan originated in Wenshui County, Bingzhou (an ancient name of the city of Taiyuan, Shanxi). Wu Zetian's birthplace is not documented in preserved historical literature and remains disputed. Some scholars argue that Wu was born in Wenshui, some that it was Lizhou (利州) (modern-day Guangyuan, Sichuan), while others insist she was born in the imperial capital of Chang'an (today known as Xi'an).

Wu Zetian was born in the seventh year of the reign of Emperor Gaozu of Tang. In the same year, a total eclipse of the sun was visible across China. Her father, Wu Shiyue, worked in the timber business and the family was relatively well-off. Her mother was from the powerful Yang family, distant relatives of the imperial family of the Sui dynasty. During the final years of Emperor Yang of Sui, Li Yuan, the future Emperor Gaozu of Tang, stayed in the Wu household many times and became close to the Wu family while holding appointments in both Hedong and Taiyuan. After Li Yuan overthrew Emperor Yang, he was generous to the Wu family, giving them grain, land, clothing and wealth. Once the Tang dynasty was established, Wu Shihou held a succession of senior ministerial posts, including the governorship of Yangzhou, Lizhou, and Jingzhou (荊州) (modern-day Jiangling County, Hubei).

Wu was encouraged by her parents to read books and pursue her education, an uncommon situation for the women at the time. She read and learned about many topics, such as music, calligraphy, literature, history, politics, and other governmental affairs. At age 14, she was taken to be an imperial concubine (lesser wife) of Emperor Taizong of Tang. At Emperor Taizong's palace, Wu took on a secretarial role. This opportunity allowed her to continue to pursue her education. She was given the title of cairen (才人), the title for one of the consorts with the 5th rank in Tang's nine-rank system for imperial officials, nobles, and consorts. When she was summoned to the palace, her mother, the Lady Yang, wept bitterly when saying farewell to her, but she responded, "How do you know that it is not my fortune to meet the Son of Heaven?" Lady Yang reportedly then understood her ambitions, and therefore stopped crying.

But Consort Wu did not appear to be much favored by Emperor Taizong, though it appears that she did have sexual relations with him at one point. According to her own account (given in a rebuke of Chancellor Ji Xu during her reign), she once impressed Taizong with her fortitude:

Emperor Taizong had a horse with the name "Lion Stallion", and it was so large and strong that no one could get on its back. I was a lady in waiting attending Emperor Taizong, and I suggested to him, "I only need three things to subordinate it: an iron whip, an iron hammer, and a sharp dagger. I will whip it with the iron whip. If it does not submit, I will hammer its head with the iron hammer. If it still does not submit, I will cut its throat with the dagger." Emperor Taizong praised my bravery. Do you really believe that you are qualified to dirty my dagger?

When Taizong died in 649, his youngest son, Li Zhi, whose mother was the main wife Wende, succeeded him as Emperor Gaozong. Li Zhi had had an affair with Wu when Taizong was still alive.

Taizong had 14 sons, including three by his beloved Empress Zhangsun (601–636), but none with Consort Wu. Thus, according to the custom by which consorts of deceased emperors who had not produced children were permanently confined to a monastic institution after the emperor's death, Wu was consigned to Ganye Temple (感業寺) with the expectation that she would serve as a Buddhist nun there for the remainder of her life. After Taizong's death, Gaozong met her at the death anniversary of Taizong when he was offering incense. At the time, Consort Xiao and Empress Wang were fighting for the favour of Gaozong, and Wang asked Gaozong to bring Wu back into the palace, hoping to divert Gaozong's attention. Gaozong agreed and gave Wu the title Lady of Bright Deportment (昭儀). Soon, Gaozong became enamored with Wu, and both Wang and Xiao lost favor.

== Rise to power ==
By early 650, Consort Wu was a concubine of Emperor Gaozong, and she had the title Zhaoyi, the highest ranking concubine of the nine concubines in the second rank. Wu progressively gained immeasurable influence over the governance of the empire throughout Emperor Gaozong's reign. Over time, she came to control most major decisions made. She was regarded as ruthless in her endeavors to grab power, and was believed by traditional historians to have killed her own children. This was later proven false, as these rumors seem to have surfaced 400 years after her death. (Note: Sources before the Song dynasty, e.g. Old Book of Tang, Tang Huiyao and Tang Shilu, did not mention such suspicions. Such suspicions were primarily mentioned in the New Book of Tang and Zizhi Tongjian; in his Zizhi Tongjian Kaoyi, Sima Guang only commented on the record regarding Li Hong. He noted that Gaozong's biography in New Book of Tang recorded that Wu "killed the taizi", while Li Hong's biography in the same work recorded that he died via poisoning. The Tang Li recorded that Li Hong "did not live to his natural lifespan". Both the Tang Shilu and Old Book of Tang did not record that Li Hong was poisoned. Sima also claimed that Emperor Suzong's advisor Li Bi told the emperor that "Xiaojing (Li Hong's posthumous name) was poisoned". Sima then theorized that the record in New Book of Tang was based on this conversation and the indirect record found in the Tang Li. Sima's own opinion was that it was impossible to accurately determine the cause of Li Hong's death. But, since people at the time did suspect Wu of poisoning Li Hong, it was necessary to record down these suspicions and pass them on to future generations as suspicions.) This was likely due to the belief in ancient China that a woman was not suited to hold the power of the emperor.

=== Imperial consort (650–655) ===
Gaozong became emperor at the age of 21. He was not the first choice, as he was inexperienced and frequently incapacitated with a sickness that caused him spells of dizziness. Gaozong was made heir to the empire only due to the disgrace of his two older brothers.

On or after the anniversary of Emperor Taizong's death, (Note: The modern historian Bo Yang, based on the fact that Consort Wu's oldest son Li Hong was born in 652, fixed the date of this incident as 650, but 651 is also a possibility. See Bo Yang Edition of Zizhi Tongjian, vol. 47.) Gaozong went to Ganye Temple to offer incense to Buddha. When he and Consort Wu saw each other, they both wept. This was seen by Gaozong's wife, Empress Wang. At that time, Gaozong did not favor Wang. Instead, he favored his concubine Pure Consort Xiao. Furthermore, Wang had no children while Xiao had one son (Li Sujie) and two daughters (Princesses Yiyang and Xuancheng).

Wang, seeing that Gaozong was still impressed by Wu's beauty, hoped that the arrival of a new concubine would divert the emperor from Xiao. Therefore, she secretly told Wu to stop shaving her hair and later welcomed her to the palace. (Some modern historians dispute this traditional account. Some think that Wu never left the imperial palace and might have had an affair with Gaozong while Taizong was still alive.)

Wu soon overtook Xiao as Gaozong's favorite. In 652, she gave birth to her first child, a son named Li Hong. In 653, she gave birth to another son, Li Xián. Neither of these sons was in contention to be Gaozong's heir, because Gaozong, at the request of officials influenced by Wang and her uncle (the chancellor Liu Shi), had designated his eldest son Li Zhong as his heir. Li Zhong's mother, Consort Liu, was of lowly birth. Wang did this in order to receive Liu's gratitude.

By 654, both Wang and Xiao had lost favor with Gaozong, and these two former romantic rivals joined forces against Wu, but to no avail. For example, as a sign of his love for Wu, Gaozong conferred posthumous honors on her father, Wu Shiyue. In the same year, Wu gave birth to a daughter. But her daughter died shortly after birth, with evidence suggesting deliberate strangulation. The evidence include allegations made by Wu herself, and she accused Wang of murder. Wang was accused of having been seen near the child's room, with corroborating testimony by alleged eyewitnesses. Gaozong was led to believe that Wang, motivated by jealousy, had most likely killed the child. Wang lacked an alibi and was unable to clear her name.

Scientifically credible forensic pathology information about the death of Wu's daughter does not exist, and scholars lack concrete evidence about her death. However, scholars have many theories and speculations. Because traditional folklore tends to portray Wu as a power-hungry woman unconcerned about whom she hurt or what she did, Wu was often portrayed as killing her own child in order to accuse Wang, the details of the child's death becoming only more detailed in non-contemporary sources after Wu's death. Other schools of thought argue that Wang indeed killed the child out of jealousy and hatred of Wu. The third argument is that the child died of asphyxiation or crib death. The ventilation systems of the time were nonexistent or of poor quality, and the lack of ventilation combined with using coal as a heating method could have led to carbon monoxide poisoning. In any case, Wu blamed Wang for the girl's death, and as a result, tried to remove Wang from her position.

Because of the child's death, an angry Gaozong also wanted to depose Wang and replace her with Wu. But first he needed to make sure that he had the support of the government chancellors. So Gaozong met with his uncle Zhangsun Wuji, the head chancellor. During the meeting, Gaozong repeatedly brought up Wang's childlessness. Childlessness was a sufficient excuse to depose Wang, but Zhangsun repeatedly found ways to divert the conversation. Subsequent visits made by Wu's mother, Lady Yang, and an official allied with Wu, Xu Jingzong, to seek support from Zhangsun were met with disappointment.

In the summer of 655, Wu accused Wang and her mother, Lady Liu, of using witchcraft. In response, Gaozong barred Liu from the palace and demoted Wang's uncle, Liu Shi. Meanwhile, a faction of officials began to form around Wu, including Li Yifu, Xu, Cui Yixuan (崔義玄), and Yuan Gongyu (袁公瑜). That autumn, Gaozong summoned the chancellors Zhangsun, Li Ji, Yu Zhining, and Chu Suiliang to the palace. Chu had deduced that the summons were about changing the empress. Li Ji claimed illness and refused to attend. At the meeting, Chu vehemently opposed deposing Wang, while Zhangsun and Yu showed their disapproval by silence. Chancellors Han Yuan and Lai Ji also opposed the move. When Gaozong asked Li Ji again, he responded, "This is your family matter, Your Imperial Majesty. Why ask anyone else?"

Gaozong therefore resolved to demote Chu to commandant at Tan Prefecture (roughly modern Changsha, Hunan), and then deposed both Wang and Xiao. He placed them under arrest and made Wu empress. Later that year, Gaozong showed signs of considering their release. Because of this, Wang and Xiao were killed on Empress Wu's orders. After their deaths, they often haunted Wu's dreams over the years.

Wu came to believe their spirits were after her. For this reason, Emperor Gaozong started remodeling a secondary palace, Daming Palace (大明宮), into Penglai Palace (蓬萊宮). When Penglai Palace's main hall, Hanyuan Hall (含元殿), was completed in 663, Gaozong and Wu moved there. It was later renamed Hanyuan Palace, yet Empress Wang and Consort Xiao still continued to appear in her dreams. Therefore, for the rest of Gaozong's reign, he and Wu often took up residence at the eastern capital Luoyang and only infrequently spent time in Chang'an.

=== Empress consort ===
==== Involvement in politics (655–660) ====
In 655, Wu became Tang Gaozong's new empress consort (皇后, húanghòu). In 656, on the advice of Xu Jingzong, Emperor Gaozong deposed Consort Liu's son Li Zhong from being his heir apparent. He changed Li Zhong's status to Prince of Liang and designated Empress Wu's son, Li Hong as the title of Prince of Dai and crown prince (that is, heir apparent). In 657, Empress Wu and her allies began reprisals against officials who had opposed her ascension. She first had Xu and Li Yifu, who were by now chancellors, falsely accuse Han Yuan and Lai Ji of being complicit with Chu Suiliang in planning treason. The three of them, along with Liu Shi, were demoted to being prefects of remote prefectures, with provisions that they would never be allowed to return to Chang'an. In 659, she had Xu accuse Zhangsun Wuji of plotting treason with the low-level officials Wei Jifang (韋季方) and Li Chao (李巢). Zhangsun was exiled and, later in the year, was forced to commit suicide in exile. Xu further implicated Chu, Liu, Han, and Yu Zhining in the plot as well. Chu, who had died in 658, was posthumously stripped of his titles, and his sons Chu Yanfu (褚彥甫) and Chu Yanchong (褚彥沖) were executed. Orders were also issued to execute Liu and Han, although Han died before the execution order reached his location.

It was said that after this time, no official dared to criticize the emperor. In 660, Li Zhong, Gaozong's first-born son (to consort Liu) was targeted. Li Zhong had feared that he would be next and had sought out advice of fortune tellers. Wu had him exiled and placed under house arrest.

==== Ruling with Emperor Gaozong (660–683) ====
In 660, Emperor Gaozong and Empress Wu toured Bian Prefecture (modern-day Taiyuan), and Empress Wu had the opportunity to invite her old neighbors and relatives to a feast. Later that year, Gaozong developed an illness marked by painful headaches and vision loss, generally thought to have been related to hypertension. He began to have Empress Wu make rulings on daily petitions by officials. Thereafter, her authority rivaled Emperor Gaozong's.

By 664, Wu was said to be interfering so much in the empire's governance that she was angering Gaozong with her controlling behavior. Furthermore, she had engaged the Taoist sorcerer Guo Xingzhen (郭行真) in using witchcraft—an act prohibited by regulations, which led to Empress Wang's downfall—and the eunuch Wang Fusheng (王伏勝) reported this to Gaozong, angering him further. He consulted the chancellor Shangguan Yi, who suggested that he depose Wu. He had Shangguan draft an edict. But as Shangguan was doing so, Wu received news of what was happening. She went to the emperor to plead her case just as he was holding the edict that Shangguan had drafted. Gaozong could not bear to depose her and blamed the episode on Shangguan. As both Shangguan and Wang had served on Li Zhong's staff, Wu had Xu falsely accuse Shangguan, Wang, and Li Zhong of planning treason. Shangguan, Wang, and Shangguan's son Shangguan Tingzhi (上官庭芝) were executed, while Li Zhong was forced to commit suicide. Shangguan Tingzhi's daughter Shangguan Wan'er, then an infant, and her mother, Lady Zheng, became slaves in the inner palace. After Shangguan Wan'er grew up, she became Empress Wu's trusted secretary.

She and Gaozong were thereafter referred to as the "Two Saints" (二聖, Er Sheng) both inside the palace and in the empire. The Later Jin historian Liu Xu, in the Old Book of Tang, (Note: While the contents of the quote are found in the Old Book of Tang, they are found in separate volumes. The reference to the "two saints" was found in the annals of Wu Zetian. The reference to a curtain while at court was found in Zhang Jiazhen's biography. Hao Chujun's opposition to Wu Zetian becoming regent was found in his biography.) commented:

When Emperor Gaozong could not listen to the court issues, all affairs were decided by the Empress of Heaven. Since the execution of Shangguan Yi, she and the emperor appeared together at the court as Sheng (Holy). The Empress of Heaven hung a curtain behind the throne, and all the political affairs were settled by her, and they were called "two saints" inside and outside. The emperor wanted to issue an edict to make the Empress of Heaven would formally take over the throne of the empire, and Hao Chujun persuaded him to stop this issue (appointment of regent).

Meanwhile, on Empress Wu's account, her mother Lady Yang had been made the Lady of Rong, and her older sister, now widowed, the Lady of Han. Her half-brothers Wu Yuanqing and Wu Yuanshuang and cousins Wu Weiliang and Wu Huaiyun, despite the poor relationships that they had with Lady Yang, were promoted. But at a feast that Lady Yang held for them, Wu Weiliang offended Lady Yang by stating that they did not find it honorable for them to be promoted on account of Empress Wu. Empress Wu, therefore, requested to have them demoted to remote prefectures—outwardly to show modesty, but in reality to avenge the offense to her mother. Wu Yuanqing and Wu Yuanshuang died in effective exile. Meanwhile, in or before 666, Lady of Han died as well. After Lady of Han's death, Emperor Gaozong made her daughter the Lady of Wei and considered keeping her in the palace—possibly as a concubine. He did not immediately do so, as he feared that Empress Wu would be displeased. It was said that Empress Wu heard of this and was nevertheless displeased. She had her niece poisoned, by placing poison in food offerings that Wu Weiliang and Wu Huaiyun had made and then blaming them for the death of the Lady of Wei. Wu Weiliang and Wu Huaiyun were executed.

In 670, Wu's mother, Lady Yang, died, and by Gaozong's and Wu's orders, all of the imperial officials and their wives attended her wake and mourned her. Later that year, with the realm suffering from a major drought, Wu offered to be deposed, which Gaozong rejected. At her request, he further posthumously honored Wu Shiyue (who had previously been posthumously honored as the Duke of Zhou) and Lady Yang by giving them the titles of the Prince and Princess of Taiyuan.

Meanwhile, the son of Empress Wu's older sister the Lady of Han, Helan Minzhi (賀蘭敏之), had been given the surname Wu and allowed to inherit the title of Duke of Zhou. But as it was becoming clear to Empress Wu that he suspected her of murdering his sister, the Lady of Wei, Wu began to take precautions against him. (Helan was also said to have had an incestuous relationship with his grandmother Lady Yang.) In 671, Helan was accused of disobeying mourning regulations during the period of mourning for Lady Yang and raping the daughter of the official Yang Sijian (楊思儉), whom Gaozong and Wu had previously selected to be the wife and crown princess for Li Hong. On Wu's orders, Helan was exiled and either was executed in exile or committed suicide. In 673, Wu provided 20,000 cash for a gigantic statue of Maitreya at Longmen Grottoes. In 674, she had Wu Yuanshuang's son Wu Chengsi recalled from exile to inherit the title of Duke of Zhou.

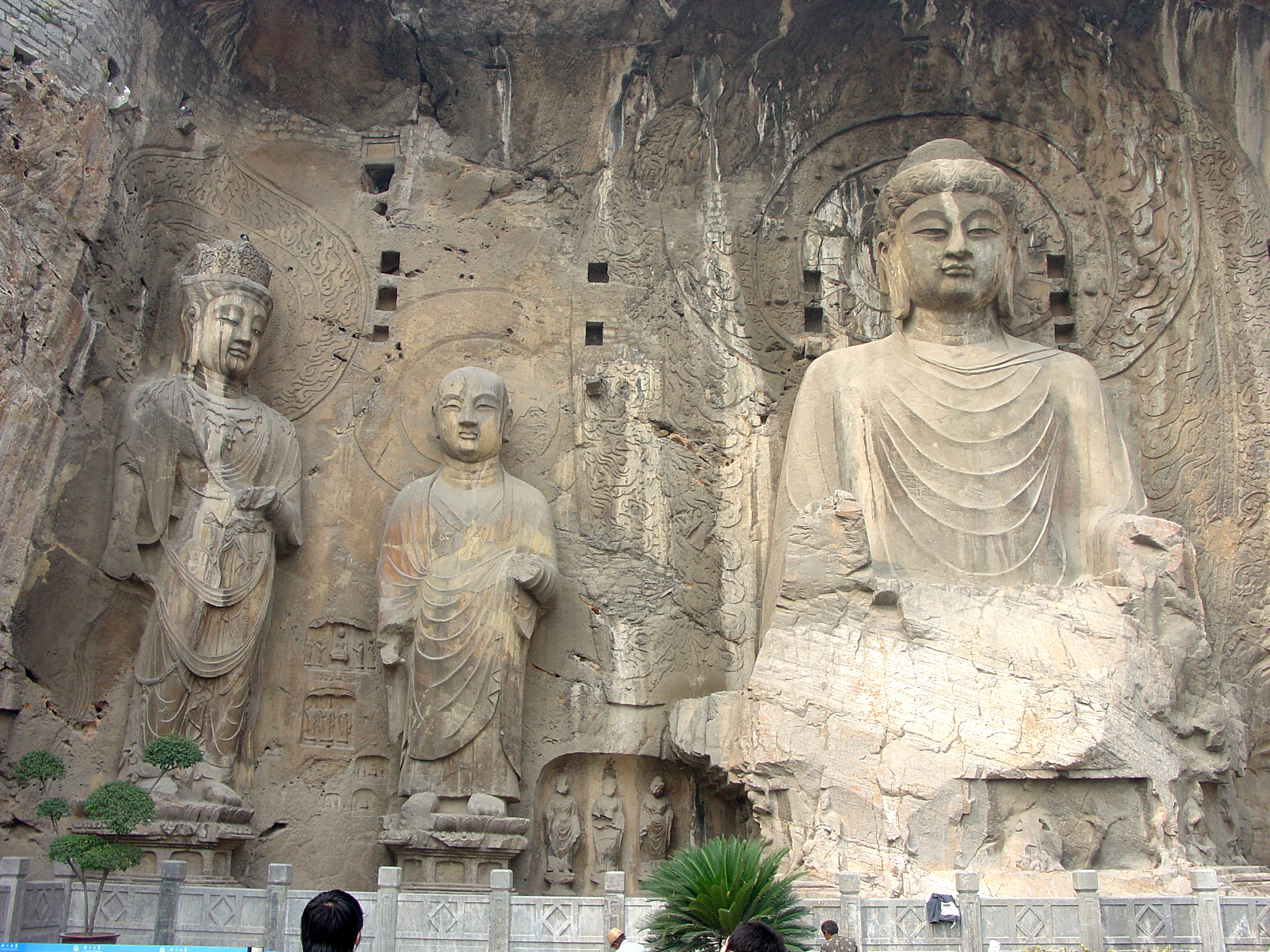
The Fengxian cave (c. 675) of the Longmen Grottoes, commissioned by Wu Zetian; the large, central Buddha is representative of the Vairocana

In 675, as Emperor Gaozong's illness worsened, he considered having Empress Wu formally rule as regent. The chancellor Hao Chujun and the official Li Yiyan both opposed this, and he did not formally make her regent, and did not formally bestow her with such authorities. But Empress Wu was more powerful than Emperor Gaozong and he was afraid of Wu because of her high intelligence and skills in manipulating officials; thus, until the end of his reign, she had decision-making power on most events in the governmental and border matters, and could appoint civil ministers and military generals.

Also in 675, a number of people fell victim to Empress Wu's ire. She had been displeased at the favor that Emperor Gaozong had shown his aunt, Princess Changle. Changle was married to General Zhao Gui (趙瓌) and had a daughter who became the wife and princess consort of Wu's third son, Li Xiǎn, the Prince of Zhou. Princess Zhao was accused of unspecified crimes and placed under arrest, eventually starving to death. Zhao Gui and Changle were exiled. Meanwhile, later that month, Li Hong, the Crown Prince—who urged Wu not to exercise so much influence and authority on Gaozong's governance and offended her by requesting that his half-sisters, Consort Xiao's daughters, Princess Yiyang and Xuancheng (under house arrest) be allowed to marry—died suddenly. Traditional historians generally believed that Wu poisoned Li Hong to death. At her request, Li Xián, then carrying the title of Prince of Yong, was created crown prince. Meanwhile, Consort Xiao's son Li Sujie and another son of Gaozong's, Li Shangjin, were repeatedly accused of crimes by Wu and were subsequently demoted.

Soon, Empress Wu's relationship with Li Xián also deteriorated because Li Xián had become unsettled after hearing rumors that he was not born to Empress Wu—but to her sister, the Lady of Han. When Empress Wu heard of his fearfulness, she became angry with him. In 678, contemporary poet Luo Binwang criticizes Empress Wu's involvement in governmental affairs: "She whispered slander from behind her sleeves, and swayed emperor with vixen flirting." Luo Binwang's remarks angered Empress Wu and he was dismissed and imprisoned.

Furthermore, the sorcerer Ming Chongyan (明崇儼), whom both she and Emperor Gaozong respected, had stated that Li Xián was unsuitable to inherit the throne and was assassinated in 679. The assassins were not caught—causing Wu to suspect that Li Xián was behind the assassination. In 680, Li Xián was accused of crimes and during an investigation by the officials Xue Yuanchao, Pei Yan, and Gao Zhizhou, a large cache of weaponry was found in Li Xián's palace. Empress Wu formally accused Li Xián of treason and the assassination of Ming. Emperor Gaozong wanted to forgive Li Xián for treason, but Empress Wu refused and he surrendered at her insistence. Li Xián was deposed and exiled, and at her request, he was placed under house arrest as a normal person.

At Empress Wu's request, after the exile of Li Xián, his younger brother Li Xiǎn [similar-sounding name but different tones and Chinese characters] (now renamed Li Zhe) was named crown prince.

In 681, Princess Taiping was married to Xue Shao (薛紹), the son of Emperor Gaozong's sister Princess Chengyang, in a grand ceremony. Empress Wu, initially unimpressed with the lineages of Xue Shao's brothers' wives, wanted to order his brothers to divorce their wives—stopping only after it was pointed out to her that Lady Xiao, the wife of Xue Shao's older brother Xue Yi (薛顗), was a grandniece of the deceased chancellor Xiao Yu. The official Feng Yuanchang was appointed by Gaozong, and he trusted him very much. In 682, Feng also lamented Empress Wu's power and involvement in the administration of the empire and told the emperor: "The queen's authority is very strong, should it be reduced?" Gaozong opposed it, as he was afraid of her, and there was nothing he could do. Upon learning of Feng's ineffective advice to the emperor, Wu became very angry with Feng, and accused him of corruption and degraded him.

In late 683, Gaozong died at Luoyang. Li Zhe took the throne as Emperor Zhongzong, but Wu retained the real authority as empress dowager and regent.

=== Empress dowager ===
==== Plenipotentiary regent for Emperor Zhongzong ====
Upon the death of her husband Emperor Gaozong, Wu became empress dowager (皇太后, húangtàihòu) and then regent and she automatically gained full power over the empire. She had the power to remove and install emperors. Just as before, government decisions were made by her. Wu had already poisoned the crown prince Li Hong and had enough other princes exiled that her third son, Li Zhe, was made heir apparent. Furthermore, Gaozong's will included provisions that Li Zhe should ascend immediately to the imperial throne, he should look to Empress Wu in regards to any important matter, either military or civil, and Empress Wu should claim the senior authority in the Empire for herself. In the second month of 684, Li Zhe ascended to the imperial throne, known as his temple name Zhongzong, for a short six weeks.

The new emperor was married to a woman of the Wei family. Because Zhongzong was as weak and incompetent as his father, the new Empress sought to place herself in the same position of great authority that Empress Wu had enjoyed.

Immediately, Emperor Zhongzong showed signs of disobeying Empress Dowager Wu. Emperor Zhongzong was under the thumb of his wife, Empress Wei. Under her influence, the Emperor appointed his father-in-law as prime minister. He also tried to make his father-in-law Shizhong (侍中, the head of the examination bureau of government, 門下省, Menxia Sheng, and a post considered one for a chancellor) and gave a mid-level office to his wet nurse's son—despite stern opposition by the chancellor Pei Yan, at one point remarking to Pei:

What would be wrong even if I gave the empire to Wei Xuanzhen? Why do you care about Shizhong so much?

Pei reported this to Empress Dowager Wu, and she, after planning with Pei, Liu Yizhi, and the generals Cheng Wuting (程務挺) and Zhang Qianxu (張虔勖), deposed Emperor Zhongzong and replaced him with her youngest son, Li Dan, the Prince of Yu (as Emperor Ruizong). Wu had Zhongzong's father-in-law, Wei Xuanzhen (韋玄貞), brought up on charges of treason. Wei Xuanzhen was sent into seclusion. Zhongzong was reduced to the title of Prince of Luling and exiled. Wu also sent General Qiu Shenji (丘神勣) to Li Xián's place in exile and forced Li Xián to commit suicide.

==== Plenipotentiary regent for Emperor Ruizong ====
Wu was the absolute ruler in both substance and appearance during the reign of her youngest son, Emperor Ruizong. She did not follow the customary pretense of hiding behind a screen or curtain and, in whispers, issued commands for the nominal ruler to formally announce. Her reign was fully recognized. Ruizong never moved into the imperial quarters or appeared at imperial functions and remained a virtual prisoner in the inner quarters. He held the title of emperor, but Wu firmly controlled the imperial court, and officials were not allowed to meet with Ruizong, nor was he allowed to rule on matters of state. It was to Wu that officials reported, with Ruizong not even nominally approving official actions. Soon after Ruizong took the throne, Wu carried out a major renaming of governmental offices and banners. Wu elevated Luoyang's status, making it a coequal capital. At her nephew Wu Chengsi's suggestion, she expanded the shrine of the Wu ancestors and gave them greater posthumous honors, and made Wu's ancestral shrine the size of the emperor's ancestral shrine.

Soon thereafter, Li Ji's grandson Li Jingye, the Duke of Ying, who had been disaffected by his own exile, started a rebellion at Yang Prefecture (揚州, roughly modern Yangzhou, Jiangsu). The rebellion initially drew popular support in the region, but Li Jingye progressed slowly in his attack and did not take advantage of that support. Meanwhile, Pei suggested to Empress Dowager Wu that she return imperial authority to the Emperor, arguing that doing so would cause the rebellion to collapse on its own. This offended Wu, and she accused him of being complicit with Li Jingye and had him executed; she also demoted, exiled, and killed a number of officials who, when Pei was arrested, tried to speak on his behalf. She sent General Li Xiaoyi (李孝逸) to attack Li Jingye, and while Li Xiaoyi was initially unsuccessful, he pushed on at the urging of his assistant Wei Yuanzhong and eventually crushed Li Jingye's forces. Li Jingye fled and was killed in flight.

By 685, Empress Dowager Wu was having an affair with the Buddhist monk Huaiyi, and over the next few years, Huaiyi received progressively greater honors. In 686, Wu offered to return imperial authorities to Emperor Ruizong, but Ruizong, knowing that she did not truly intend to do so, declined, and she continued to exercise imperial authority. Meanwhile, she installed copper mailboxes outside the imperial government buildings to encourage the people of the realm to report secretly on others, as she suspected many officials of opposing her. Wu personally read all the reports of betrayal. Secret police officials, including Suo Yuanli, Zhou Xing, and Lai Junchen, began to rise in power and carry out systematic false accusations, torture, and executions.

In 688, Empress Dowager Wu was set to make sacrifices to the deity of the Luo River (洛水, flowing through the Henan province city of Luoyang, then the "Eastern Capital"). She summoned senior members of Tang's Li imperial clan to Luoyang. Worried that she planned to slaughter them and secure the throne for herself, the imperial princes plotted to resist her. But before a rebellion could be comprehensively planned, Li Zhen and his son Li Chong the Prince of Langye rose first at their respective posts as prefects of Yu Prefecture (豫州, roughly modern Zhumadian, Henan) and Bo Prefecture (博州, roughly modern Liaocheng, Shandong). The other princes were not yet ready, and did not rise, and forces sent by Empress Dowager Wu and the local forces crushed Li Chong and Li Zhen's forces quickly. Wu took this opportunity to arrest Emperor Gaozong's granduncles Li Yuanjia (李元嘉) the Prince of Han, Li Lingkui (李靈夔) the Prince of Lu, and Princess Changle, as well as many other members of the Li clan, and forced them to commit suicide. Even Princess Taiping's husband Xue Shao was implicated and starved to death. In the subsequent years, there continued to be many politically motivated massacres of officials and Li clan members.

In 690, Wu took the final step to become the empress regnant of the newly proclaimed Zhou dynasty, and the title Huangdi. Traditional Chinese order of succession (akin to the Salic law in Europe) did not allow a woman to ascend the throne, but Wu was determined to quash the opposition and the use of the secret police continued after she took the throne. While her organization of the civil service system was criticized for its laxity of the promotion of officials, Wu was still considered capable of evaluating the officials' performance once they were in office. The Song dynasty historian Sima Guang, in his Zizhi Tongjian, writes:

Even though the Empress Dowager (Note: Throughout the Zizhi Tongjian's descriptions of Wu Zetian's reign, Sima referred to her as "the Empress Dowager", implicitly refusing to recognize her as empress regnant, although he used her era names.) excessively used official titles to cause people to submit to her, if she saw that someone was incompetent, she would immediately depose or even execute him. She grasped the powers of punishment and award, controlled the state, and made her own judgments as to policy decisions. She was observant and had good judgment, so the talented people of the time also were willing to be used by her.

== As emperor ==
In 690, Wu had Emperor Ruizong yield the throne to her and established the Zhou dynasty, with herself as the Emperor (Huangdi).

The early part of her reign was characterized by secret police terror, which moderated as the years went by. On the other hand, she was recognized as a capable and attentive ruler even by traditional historians who despised her, and her ability to select capable men to serve as officials was admired for the rest of the Tang dynasty as well as in subsequent dynasties. (Note: See, e.g., Zizhi Tongjian (1084), vol. 234 [submission of Lu Zhi to Emperor Dezong of Tang, citing Wu Zetian as the prime example of a capable selector of officials]; Zhao Yi's Notes of the Twenty-Two Histories (二十二史劄記), Empress Wu Accepted Corrections and Knew People. http://ctwang.myweb.hinet.net/22szj/300/0260.htm.)

Wu Zetian's reign was a pivotal moment for the imperial examination system. The reason for this was because up until that point, the Tang rulers had all been male members of the Li family. Wu Zetian, who officially took the title of emperor in 690, was a woman outside the Li family who needed an alternative base of power. Reform of the imperial examinations featured prominently in her plan to create a new class of elite bureaucrats derived from humbler origins. Both the palace and military examinations were created under Wu Zetian which were based solely on merit.

=== Early reign (690–696) ===
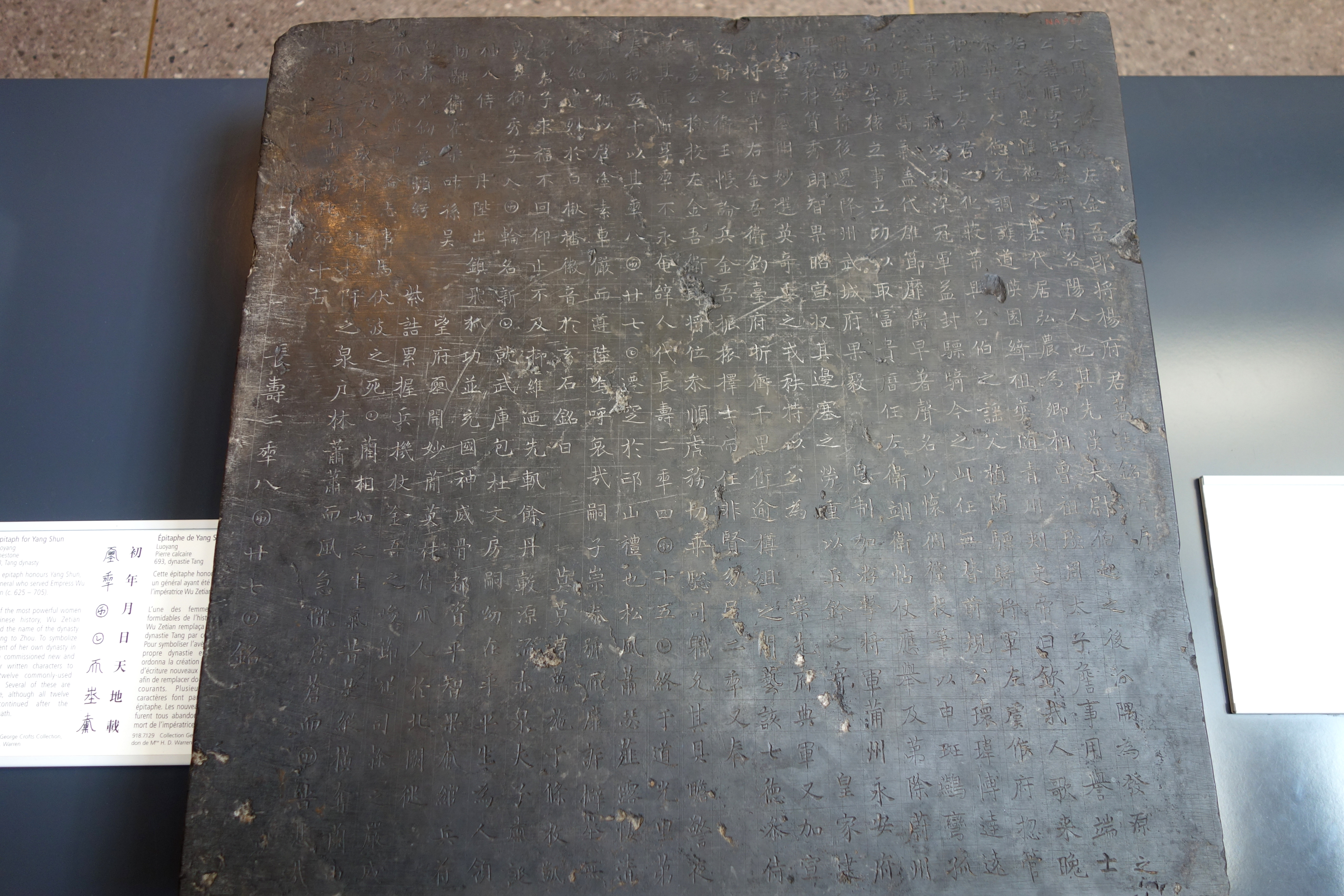
Epitaph for Yang Shun, general to Empress Wu Zetian, China, Luoyang, 693, limestone, Royal Ontario Museum

Shortly after Wu took the throne in her newly established dynasty, she elevated the status of Buddhism above that of Taoism. She officially sanctioned Buddhism by building temples named Dayun Temple (大雲寺) in each prefecture belonging to the capital regions of the two capitals, Luoyang and Chang'an, and created nine senior monks as dukes. She enshrined seven generations of Wu ancestors at the imperial ancestral temple, while continuing to offer sacrifices to the Tang emperors Gaozu, Taizong, and Gaozong.

Wu faced the issue of succession. At the time she took the throne, she created Li Dan, the former Emperor Ruizong, crown prince, and bestowed the name Wu on him. The official Zhang Jiafu convinced the commoner Wang Qingzhi (王慶之) to start a petition drive to make her nephew Wu Chengsi crown prince, arguing that an emperor named Wu should pass the throne to a member of the Wu clan. Wu Zetian was tempted to do so, and when the chancellors Cen Changqian and Ge Fuyuan opposed sternly, they, along with fellow chancellor Ouyang Tong, were executed. She ultimately declined Wang's request to make Wu Chengsi crown prince, but for a time allowed Wang to freely enter the palace to see her.

On one occasion, when Wang angered her by coming to the palace too much, she asked the official Li Zhaode to batter Wang as punishment. Li Zhaode exploited the opportunity to batter Wang to death, and his group of petitioners scattered. Li Zhaode then persuaded Wu Zetian to keep Li Dan as crown prince—pointing out that a son was closer in relations than a nephew, and that if Wu Chengsi became emperor, Gaozong would never again be worshiped. Wu Zetian agreed, and for some time did not reconsider the matter. At Li Zhaode's warning that Wu Chengsi was becoming too powerful, Wu Zetian stripped Wu Chengsi of his authority as chancellor and bestowed on him largely honorific titles without authority.

Meanwhile, the secret police officials' power continued to increase, until they appeared to be curbed, starting in about 692, when Lai Junchen was foiled in his attempt to have the chancellors Ren Zhigu, Di Renjie, Pei Xingben, and other officials Cui Xuanli (崔宣禮), Lu Xian (盧獻), Wei Yuanzhong, and Li Sizhen (李嗣眞) executed. Di, under arrest, had hidden a secret petition inside a change of clothes and had it submitted by his son Di Guangyuan (狄光遠). The seven were exiled. After this incident, particularly at the urging of Li Zhaode, Zhu Jingze, and Zhou Ju (周矩), the waves of politically motivated massacres decreased, although they did not end entirely. Wu Zetian utilized the imperial examination system to find talented poor people or people without backgrounds to stabilize her regime.

Also in 692, Wu Zetian commissioned the general Wang Xiaojie to attack the Tibetan Empire. Wang recaptured the four garrisons of the Western Regions that had fallen to the Tibetan Empire in 670 – Kucha, Yutian, Kashgar, and Suyab.

In 693, after Wu's trusted lady-in-waiting Wei Tuan'er (韋團兒), who hated Li Dan because he rejected her advances, falsely accused Li Dan's wife Crown Princess Liu and Consort Dou of using witchcraft, Wu had Crown Princess Liu and Consort Dou killed. Li Dan, fearful that he was next, did not dare speak of them. When Wei planned to falsely accuse Li Dan, someone informed on her, and she was executed. Wu had Li Dan's sons demoted in their princely titles. When the officials Pei Feigong (裴匪躬) and Fan Yunxian (范雲仙) were accused of secretly meeting Li Dan, she executed Pei and Fan and further barred officials from meeting Li Dan.

There were then accusations that Li Dan was plotting treason. Under Wu's direction, Lai launched an investigation. He arrested Li Dan's servants and tortured them. The torture was such that many of them were ready to falsely implicate themselves and Li Dan. One of Li Dan's servants, An Jincang, proclaimed Li Dan's innocence and cut his own belly open to swear to that fact. When Wu heard what An did, she had doctors attend to An and barely saved his life, and then ordered Lai to end the investigation, saving Li Dan.

In 694, Li Zhaode, who had become powerful after Wu Chengsi's removal, was thought to be too powerful, and Wu Zetian removed him. Also around this time, she became highly impressed with a group of mystic individuals—the hermit Wei Shifang (on whom she bestowed a chancellor title briefly), who claimed to be more than 350 years old; an old Buddhist nun who claimed to be a Buddha and capable of predicting the future; and a non-Han man who claimed to be 500 years old. During this time, Wu briefly claimed to be and adopted the cult imagery of Maitreya in order to build popular support for her reign.

In 695, after the imperial meeting hall (明堂) and the Heavenly Hall (天堂) were burned by Huaiyi, who was jealous at Wu's taking another lover, the imperial physician Shen Nanqiu (沈南璆), Wu became angry at these mystics for failing to predict the fire. The old nun and her students were arrested and made into slaves. Wei committed suicide. The old non-Han man fled. Wu put Huaiyi to death. After this incident, she appeared to pay less attention to mysticism and became even more dedicated than before to the affairs of state.

=== Middle reign (696–701) ===
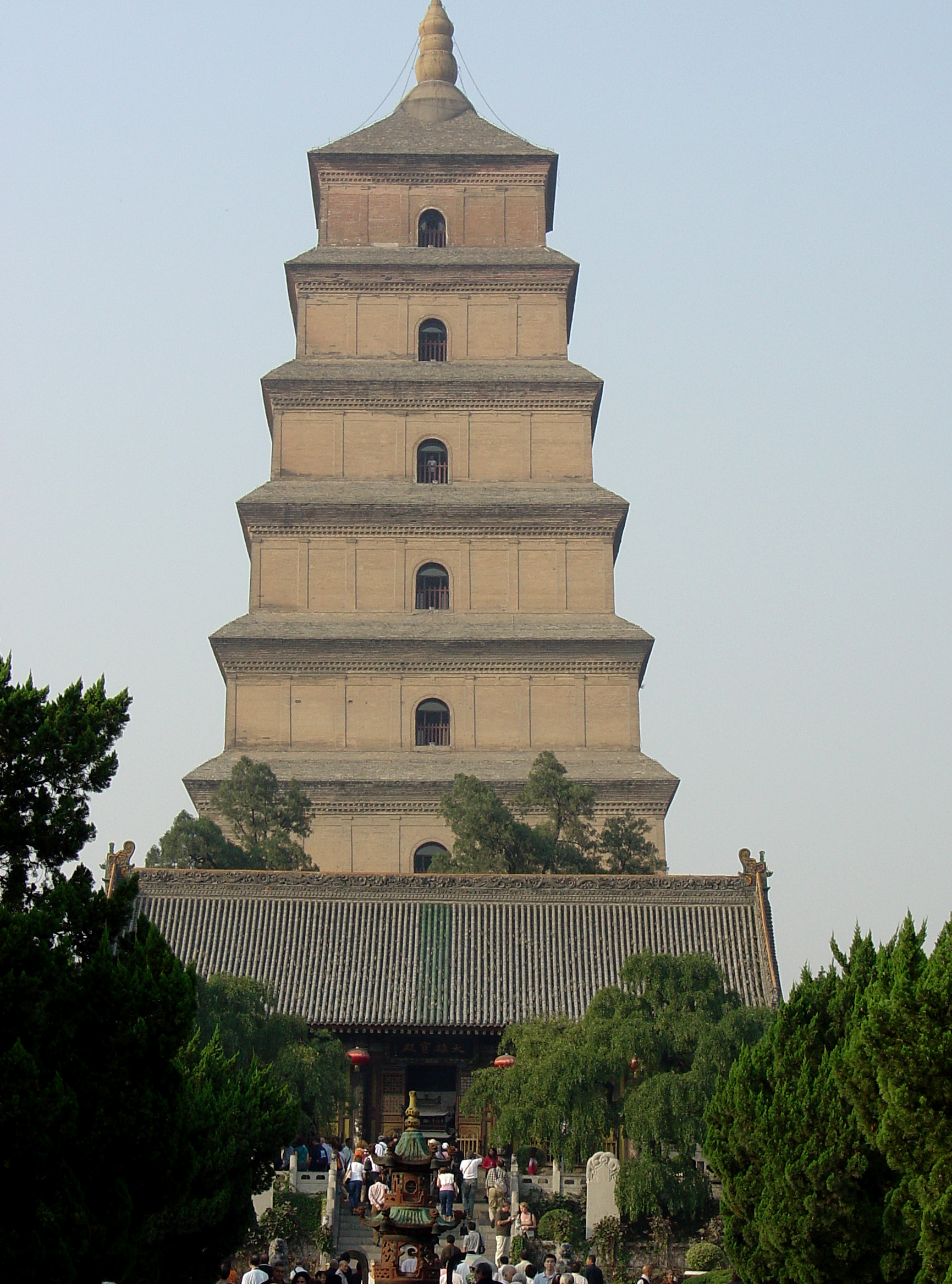
The Giant Wild Goose Pagoda. Originally built in 652, it collapsed and was rebuilt in 701–704 during the reign of Wu Zetian. The present structure is largely the same as it was in the 8th century, although it used to be three stories taller before the damage caused by the 1556 Shaanxi earthquake.

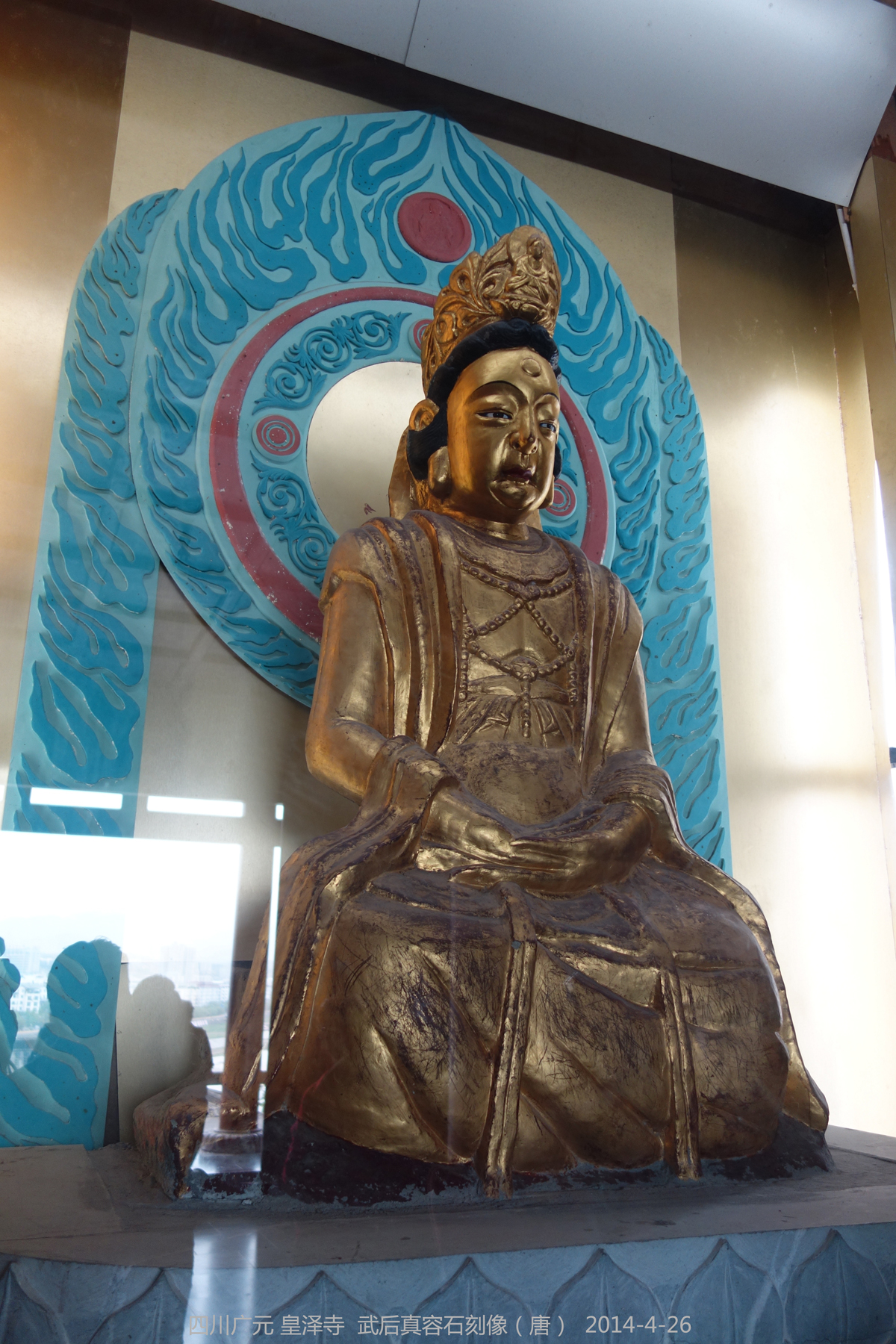
Buddhist statue of Wu Zetian from the 8th century, based on her likeness. Huangze Temple, Sichuan

Wu's administration soon faced various troubles on the western and northern borders. In spring 696, she sent an army commanded by Wang Xiaojie and Lou Shide against the Tibetan Empire, which was soundly defeated by Tibetan generals, the brothers Gar Trinring Tsendro (論欽陵) and Gar Tsenba (論贊婆). As a result, she demoted Wang to commoner rank and Lou to a low-level prefectural official, though she eventually restored both to general positions. In April of the same year, Wu recast the Nine Tripod Cauldrons, the symbol of ultimate power in ancient China, to reinforce her authority.

A much more serious threat arose in summer 696. The Khitan chieftains Li Jinzhong and Sun Wanrong, brothers-in-law, angry over the mistreatment of the Khitan people by the Zhou official Zhao Wenhui (趙文翽), the prefect of Ying Prefecture (營州, roughly Zhaoyang County, Liaoning), rebelled, with Li assuming the title of Wushang Khan (無上可汗). Armies that Wu sent to suppress Li and Sun's rebellion were defeated by Khitan forces, which attacked Zhou proper. Meanwhile, Qapaghan Qaghan of the Second Turkic Khaganate offered to submit, while also launching attacks against Zhou and Khitan. The attacks included one against the Khitan base of operations during the winter of 696, shortly after Li's death, which resulted in the capturing of Li's and Sun's families and temporarily halted Khitan operations against Zhou.

Sun, after taking over as khan and reorganizing Khitan forces, again attacked Zhou territory and had many victories over Zhou forces, including a battle during which Wang Shijie was killed. Wu tried to allay the situation by making peace with Ashina Mochuo on fairly costly terms—the return of Tujue people who had previously submitted to Zhou and providing Mochuo with seeds, silk, tools, and iron. In summer 697, Mochuo launched another attack on Khitan's base of operations, and this time, after his attack, Khitan forces collapsed and Sun was killed in flight, ending the Khitan threat.

Meanwhile, also in 697, Lai Junchen, who had at one point lost power but then returned to power, falsely accused Li Zhaode (who had been pardoned) of crimes, and then planned to falsely accuse Li Dan, Li Zhe, the Wu clan princes, and Princess Taiping of treason. The Wu clan princes and Princess Taiping acted first against him, accusing him of crimes, and he and Li Zhaode were executed together. After Lai's death, the secret police's reign largely ended. Gradually, many of the victims of Lai and the other secret police officials were exonerated posthumously. Meanwhile, around this time, Wu began relationships with two new lovers—the brothers Zhang Yizhi and Zhang Changzong, who became honored within the palace and were eventually created dukes.

Around 698, Wu Chengsi and another nephew of Wu Zetian's, Wu Sansi, the Prince of Liang, repeatedly made attempts to have officials persuade Wu Zetian to make one of them crown prince—again arguing that an emperor should pass the throne to someone of the same clan. But Di Renjie, who by now had become a trusted chancellor, firmly opposed the idea, and proposed that Li Zhe be recalled instead. He was supported in this by fellow chancellors Wang Fangqing and Wang Jishan, as well as Wu Zetian's close advisor Ji Xu, who further persuaded the Zhang brothers to support the idea. In spring 698, Wu agreed and recalled Li Zhe from exile. Soon, Li Dan offered to yield the crown prince position to Li Zhe, and Wu created Li Zhe crown prince. She soon changed his name back to Li Xiǎn and then Wu Xian.

Later, Ashina Mochuo demanded a Tang dynasty prince for marriage to his daughter, part of a plot to join his family with the Tang, displace the Zhou, and restore Tang rule over China, under his influence. When Wu sent a member of her own family, grandnephew Wu Yanxiu (武延秀), to marry Mochuo's daughter instead, he rejected him. Mochuo had no intention to cement the peace treaty with a marriage. Instead, when Wu Yanxiu arrived, he detained him and then launched a major attack on Zhou, advancing as far south as Zhao Prefecture (趙州, in modern Shijiazhuang, Hebei) before withdrawing.

In 699, the Tibetan threat ceased. Emperor Tridu Songtsen, unhappy that Gar Trinring was monopolizing power, slaughtered Trinring's associates when Trinring was away from Lhasa. He then defeated Trinring in battle, and Trinring committed suicide. Gar Tsenba and Trinring's son, Lun Gongren (論弓仁), surrendered to Zhou. After this, the Tibetan Empire underwent internal turmoil for several years, and there was peace for Zhou in the border region.

Also in 699, Wu, realizing that she was growing old, feared that after her death, Li Xian and the Wu clan princes would not have peace with each other. She made him, Li Dan, Princess Taiping, Princess Taiping's second husband Wu Youji (a nephew of hers), the Prince of Ding, and other Wu clan princes to swear an oath to each other.

=== Late reign (701–705) ===
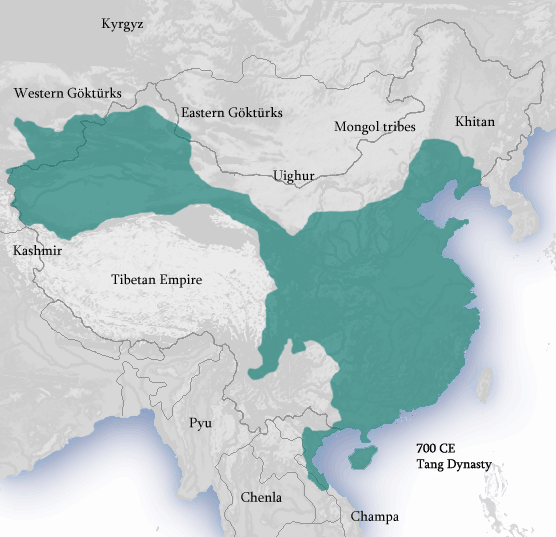
The estimated territorial extent of Wu Zetian's empire

As Wu grew older, Zhang Yizhi and Zhang Changzong became increasingly powerful, and even the princes of the Wu clan sought their favour. She increasingly relied on them to handle the affairs of state. This was secretly discussed and criticized by her grandson Li Chongrun, the Prince of Shao (Li Xian's son), granddaughter Li Xianhui (李仙蕙) the Lady Yongtai (Li Chongrun's sister), and Li Xianhui's husband Wu Yanji (武延基) the Prince of Wei (Wu Zetian's grandnephew and Wu Chengsi's son). Somehow the discussion was leaked, and Zhang Yizhi reported this to Wu. She ordered the three of them to commit suicide. (Note: The Zizhi Tongjian asserted that Li Chongrun was forced to commit suicide, but the Old Book of Tang and the New Book of Tang asserted in his biographies that he was caned to death on Wu Zetian's orders. Compare Zizhi Tongjian (1084), vol. 207 with Old Book of Tang, vol. 86 and New Book of Tang, vol. 81. In vol.11 of Zizhi Tongjian Kaoyi, Sima Guang noted that on the issue of Li Chongrun's death, Tongjian adopted the account found in Tang Shilu. The Old Book of Tang, meanwhile, inconsistently asserted in the chronicles of Wu Zetian's reign that he was forced to commit suicide. (Old Book of Tang, vol. 6) The chronicles of Wu Zetian's reign in the New Book of Tang merely stated that the three of them "were killed". (New Book of Tang, vol. 4).) (Note: However, some modern historians, based on the text on Li Xianhui's tombstone (written after Emperor Zhongzong was restored to the throne in 705), which suggested that she died the day after her brother and her husband and that she was pregnant at death, and the fact that the skeleton believed to be hers had a small pelvis, have proposed the theory that she was not ordered to commit suicide, but had, in grief over her brother's and husband's deaths, had either a miscarriage or a difficult birth and died from that. See, e.g., illustrations preceding the Bo Yang Edition of the Zizhi Tongjian, vol. 49.)

Despite her age, Wu continued to be interested in finding talented officials and promoting them. People she promoted in her old age included Cui Xuanwei and Zhang Jiazhen.

By 703, Zhang Yizhi and Zhang Changzong had become resentful of Wei Yuanzhong, who by now was a senior chancellor, for dressing down their brother Zhang Changyi (張昌儀) and rejecting the promotion of another brother, Zhang Changqi (張昌期). They also were fearful that if Wu died, Wei would find a way to execute them, and therefore accused Wei and Gao Jian (高戩), an official favored by Princess Taiping, of speculating on Wu's old age and death. They initially got Wei's subordinate Zhang Shuo to agree to corroborate the charges, but once Zhang Shuo was before Wu, he instead accused Zhang Yizhi and Zhang Changzong of forcing him to bear false witness. As a result, Wei, Gao, and Zhang Shuo were exiled, but escaped death.

== Removal and death ==
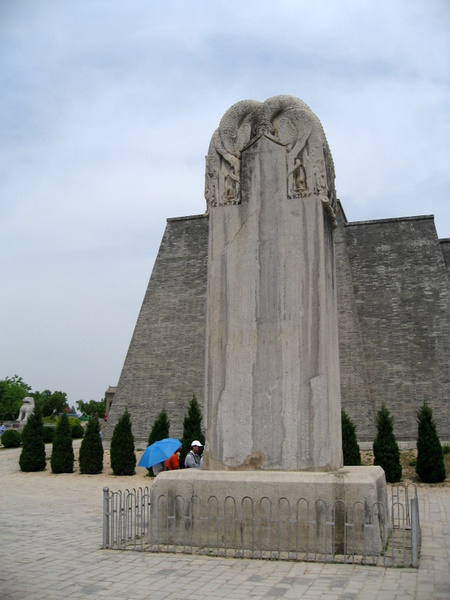
Located to the east of Phoenix Gate within the Qianling Mausoleum–built near Chang'an in 706 to house the remains of Tang Gaozong, Empress Wu, and other royal members of the Chinese Tang dynasty–is the large Blank Tablet or Wordless Stele. This tablet is 6.3 meters tall and weighs 98 metric tons. Although no written inscriptions adorn this edifice (hence its name), the sides of the tablet feature carved dragons while the top features carved oysters.

In autumn 704, accusations of corruption began to be levelled against Zhang Yizhi and Zhang Changzong, as well as their brothers Zhang Changqi, Zhang Changyi, and Zhang Tongxiu (張同休). Zhang Tongxiu and Zhang Changyi were demoted, but even though the officials Li Chengjia (李承嘉) and Huan Yanfan advocated that Zhang Yizhi and Zhang Changzong be removed as well, Wu Zetian, taking the suggestion of the chancellor Yang Zaisi, did not do so. Subsequently, charges of corruption against Zhang Yizhi and Zhang Changzong were renewed by the chancellor Wei Anshi.

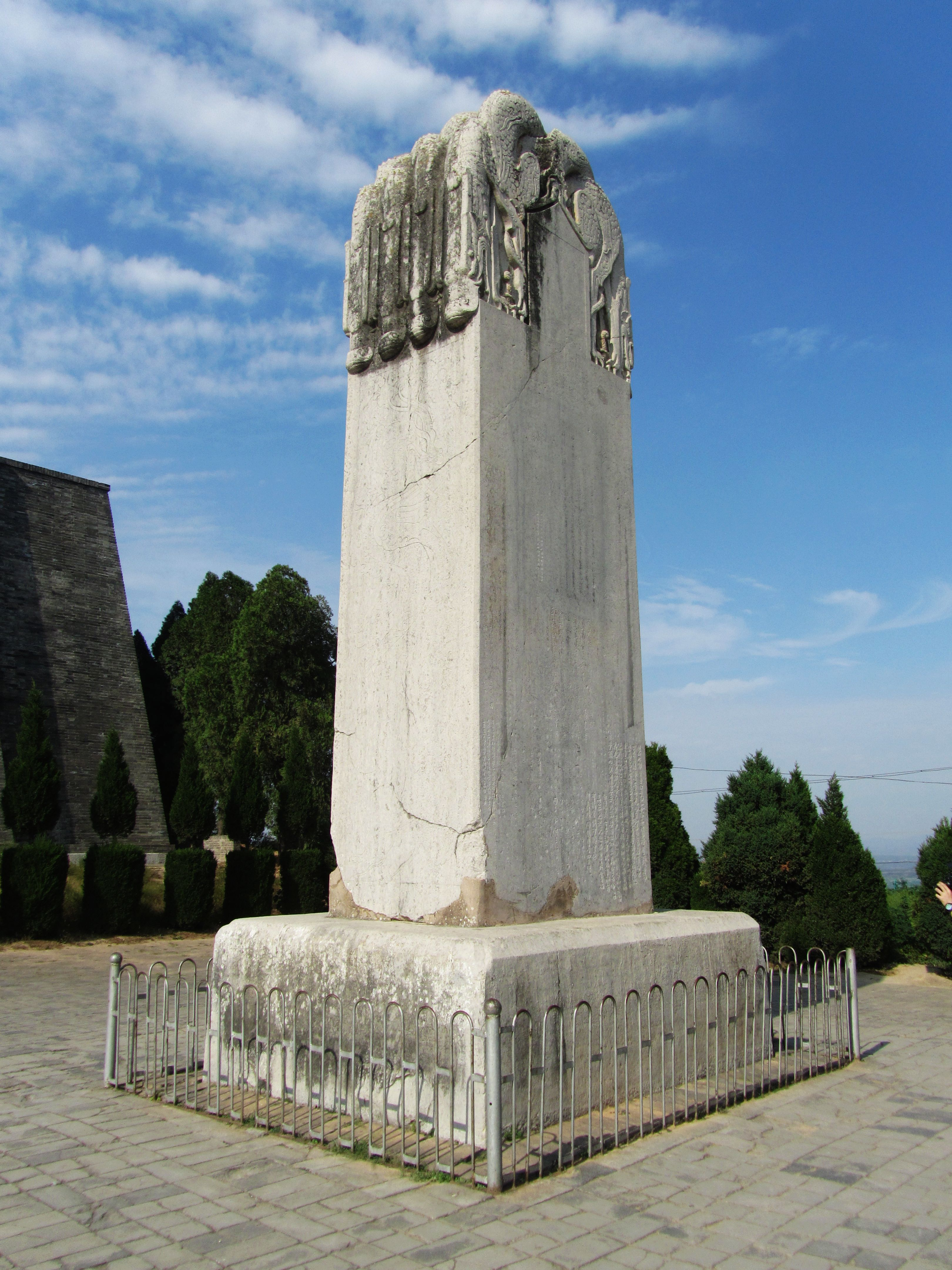
Side view of the Blank Tablet

In winter 704, Wu Zetian became seriously ill for a period, and only the Zhang brothers were allowed to see her; the chancellors were not. This led to speculation that Zhang Yizhi and Zhang Changzong were plotting to take over the throne, and there were repeated accusations of treason. Once her condition improved, Cui Xuanwei advocated that only Li Xian and Li Dan be allowed to attend to her—a suggestion she did not accept. After further accusations against the Zhang brothers by Huan and Song Jing, Wu allowed Song to investigate, but before the investigation was completed, she issued a pardon for Zhang Yizhi, derailing Song's investigation.

By spring 705, Wu was seriously ill again. Zhang Jianzhi, Jing Hui, and Yuan Shuji planned a coup to kill the Zhang brothers. They convinced the generals Li Duozuo, Li Zhan (李湛), and Yang Yuanyan (楊元琰) and another chancellor, Yao Yuanzhi, to be involved. With agreement from Li Xian as well, they acted on 20 February, killing Zhang Yizhi and Zhang Changzong, and had Changsheng Hall (長生殿), where Wu was residing, surrounded. They then reported to her that the Zhang brothers had been executed for treason, and forced her to yield the throne to Li Xian. On 21 February, an edict was issued in her name that made Li Xian regent, and on 22 February, an edict was issued in her name passing the throne to him. On 23 February, Li Xian formally retook the throne, and the next day, under heavy guard, Wu was moved to the subsidiary palace, Shangyang Palace (上陽宮), while still honored with the title of Empress Regnant Zetian Dasheng (則天大聖皇帝). On 3 March, the restoration of the Tang dynasty was celebrated, thus ending the Zhou.

Wu died on 16 December, and, pursuant to a final edict issued in her name, was no longer called empress regnant, but instead "Empress Consort Zetian Dasheng" (則天大聖皇后). In 706, Wu's son Emperor Zhongzong had his father, Emperor Gaozong and Wu interred in a joint burial at the Qianling Mausoleum, near the capital Chang'an on Mount Liang. Zhongzong also buried at Qianling his brother Li Xián, son Li Chongrun, and daughter Li Xianhui (李仙蕙) the Lady Yongtai (posthumously honored as the Princess Yongtai)—victims of Wu's wrath.

== Wu Zhou dynasty ==
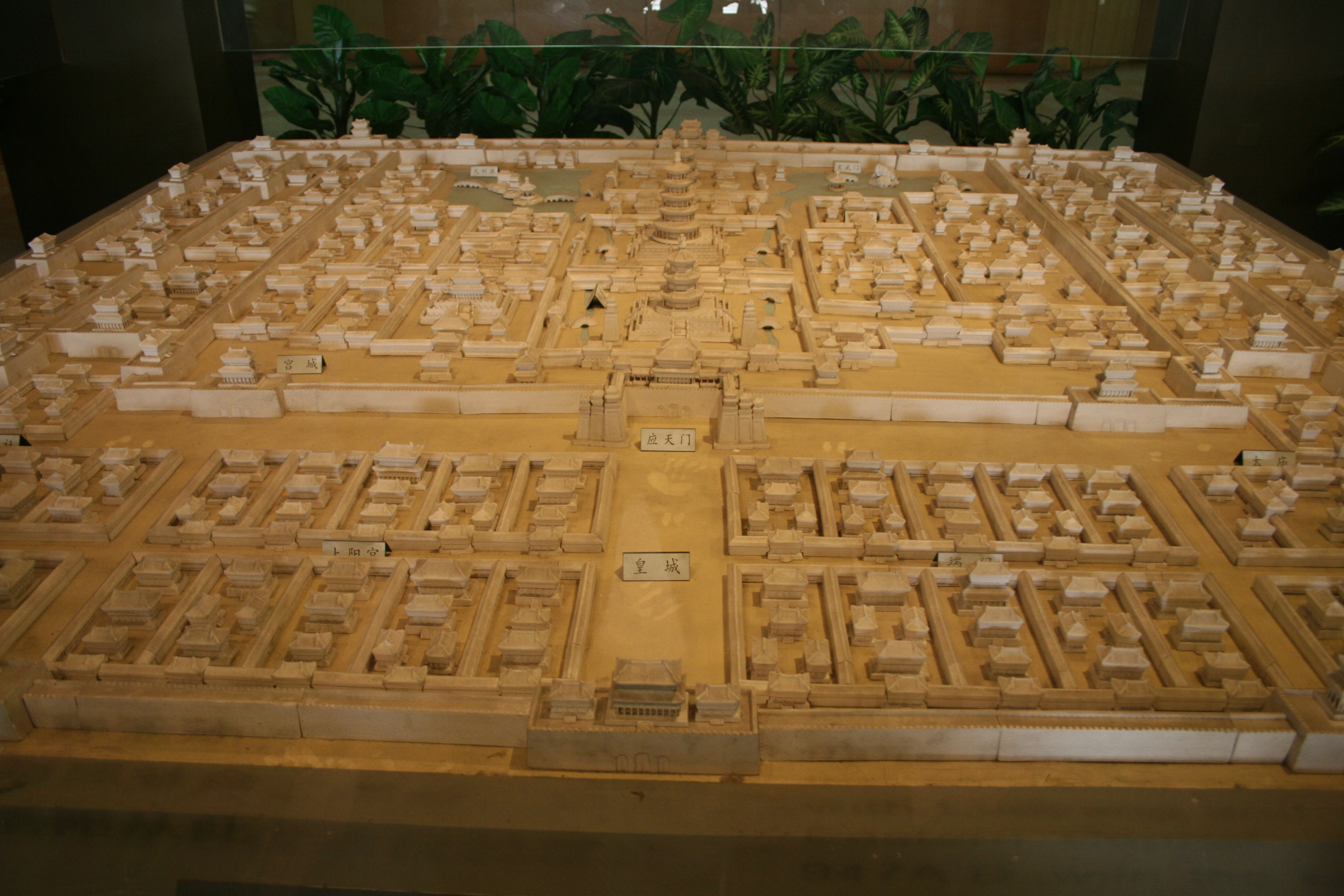
Model of Luoyang palace city during Wu Zetian's reign

In 690, Wu Zetian founded the Wu Zhou dynasty, named after the historical Zhou dynasty (1046–256 BC). Traditionally, the Wu Zhou dynasty has not been regarded as a dynasty in its own right because dynasties involve successive rulers from the same family, whereas Wu Zhou began with Wu and ended with her abdication in 705. The alternative is to view the Wu Zhou dynasty as the revival of the historical Zhou dynasty, which was ruled (at least nominally) by the Ji family, almost a thousand years before. Either way, the Wu Zhou dynasty was a brief interruption of the Li family's Tang dynasty, not a fully realized dynasty. But Wu's claim to found a new dynasty was little opposed at the time (690). The 15-year period that Wu designated as her "Zhou dynasty", considered in the context of nearly a half century of de facto and de jure rule (c. 654–705), reveals a remarkable and still debated period of history. In this context, designating a new dynasty with her as emperor can be seen as part of her power politics and as the culmination of her rule. Though Wu's Zhou dynasty had its own notable characteristics, they are difficult to separate from Wu's reign of power, which lasted for about half of a century.

Wu's consolidation of power in part relied on a system of spies. She used informants to choose people to eliminate, a process that peaked in 697 with the wholesale demotion, exile, or killing of various aristocratic families and scholars, furthermore prohibiting their sons from holding office.

Wu eliminated many of her real, potential, or perceived rivals to power by means of death (including execution, suicide by command, and more or less directly killing people), demotion, and exile. Mostly this was carried out by her secret police, led by people like Wan Ganjun and Lai Junchen, who were known to have written the Manual of Accusation, a document detailing steps for interrogation and obtaining confessions by torture. One of these methods, the "Dying Swine's Melancholy" (死猪愁), which merely indicated a level of pain inflicted by a torture device, seems to have been conflated in the years following Wu's death with the story of the "human swine" torture conducted by Empress Lü Zhi, in which her victim had her eyes gouged out, hands and feet chopped off, ears burnt, and was imprisoned in a latrine.

Wu targeted various people, including many in her own family. In reaction to an attempt to remove her from power, in 684, she massacred 12 entire collateral branches of the imperial family. Besides this, she also altered the ancient balance of power in China dating to the Qin dynasty. The old area of the Qin state was later called Guanzhong—literally, the area "within the fortified mountain passes". From this area of northwest China, the Ying family of Qin arose, unifying China into its first historical empire. During the Han dynasty, Sima Qian records in his Shiji that Guanzhong had three-tenths of China's population but six-tenths of its wealth. Additionally, at the beginning of Wu's ascendency, Guanzhong was still the stronghold of the most nationally powerful aristocratic families, even though economic development in other parts of China had improved the lot of families in other regions. The Guangzhong aristocracy was not willing to relinquish its hold on the reins of government, but some of the more newly wealthy families in other areas, such as the North China Plain or Hubei, were eager for a larger share of national power. Most of the opposition to Wu was from the Guangzhong families of northwest China. Accordingly, she repressed them, instead favoring less privileged families, thus raising to the ranks of power many talented but less aristocratic families, often recruited through the official examination system. Many of those so favored originated from the North China plain. Through a process of eliminating or diminishing the power of the established aristocracy, whom she perceived as disloyal to her, and establishing a reformed upper class in China loyal to her, Wu made major social changes that historians are still evaluating.

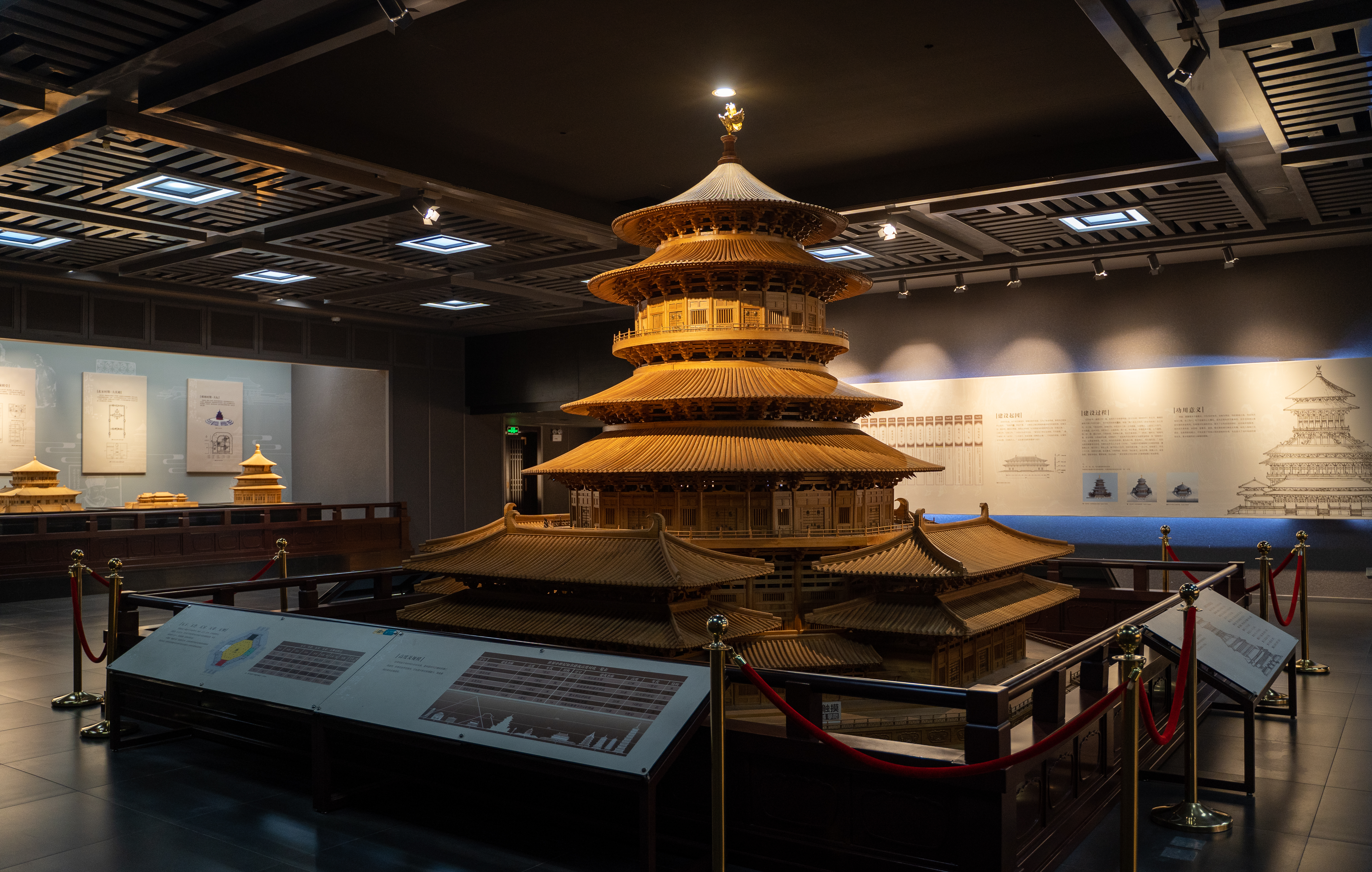
Model of Bright Hall of Luoyang commissioned by Wu Zetian (original 294 chi = 93m tall). Many major construction projects were started during Wu Zetian's time.

Many of Wu's measures were popular and helped her to gain support for her rule. Wu came to power during a time in China in which the people were fairly contented, the administration was run well, and the economy was characterized by rising living standards. For the most part, as far as the masses were concerned, Wu continued in this manner. She was determined that free, self-sufficient farmers continue to work their own land, so she periodically used the juntian, equal-field system, together with updated census figures to ensure fair land allocations, reallocating as necessary. Much of her success was due to her various edicts (including those known as her "Acts of Grace"), which helped satisfy the needs of the lower classes through various acts of relief, her widening recruitment to government service to include previously excluded gentry and commoners, and her generous promotions and pay raises for the lower ranks.

Wu used her military and diplomatic skills to enhance her position. The fubing system of self-supportive soldier-farmer colonies, which provided local militia and labor services for her government, allowed her to maintain her armed forces at reduced expense. She also pursued a policy of military action to expand the empire to its furthest extent ever up to that point in Central Asia. Expansion efforts against Tibet and to the northwest were less successful. Allying with the Korean kingdom of Silla against Goguryeo with the promise of ceding Goguryeo's territory to Silla, Chinese forces occupied Goguryeo after its defeat, and even began to occupy Silla territory. Silla resisted the imposition of Chinese rule, and by allying with Goguryeo and Baekche, was able to expel its former ally from the peninsula. Hong argues that Silla's success was in part due to a shift in Wu's focus to Tibet and inadequate support for the forces in the Korean peninsula. In 694, Wu's forces decisively defeated the Tibetan–Western Turk alliance and retook the Four Garrisons of Anxi.

In 651, shortly after the Muslim conquest of Persia, the first Arab ambassador arrived in China.

=== Reform of the imperial examination system ===
One apparatus of government that fell into Wu's power was the imperial examination system, the basic theory and practice of which was to recruit into government service those men who were the best educated, most talented, and had the best potential to perform their duties, and to do so by testing a pool of candidates to determine this. This pool was male only, and the qualified pool of candidates and resulting placements into official positions was on a relatively small scale at the time Wu took control of government. The official tests examined things considered important for functionaries of the highly developed, bureaucratic government structure of the imperial government, such as level of literacy in terms of reading and writing and possession of the specific knowledge considered necessary and desirable for a governmental official, such as Confucian precepts on the nature of virtue and theory on the proper ordering of and relationships within society. Wu continued to use the imperial examination system to recruit civil servants, and introduced major changes to the system she inherited, including increasing the pool of candidates permitted to take the test by allowing commoners and gentry, previously disqualified by their background, to take it. In 693, she expanded the governmental examination system and greatly increased the importance of this method of recruiting government officials. Wu provided increased opportunity for the representation within government to people of the North China Plain versus people of the northwestern aristocratic families, and the successful candidates recruited through the examination system became an elite group within her government. The historical details of the consequences of Wu's promoting a new group of people from previously disenfranchised backgrounds into prominence as powerful governmental officials, and the examination system's role, remain debated by scholars of this subject.

== Religion ==
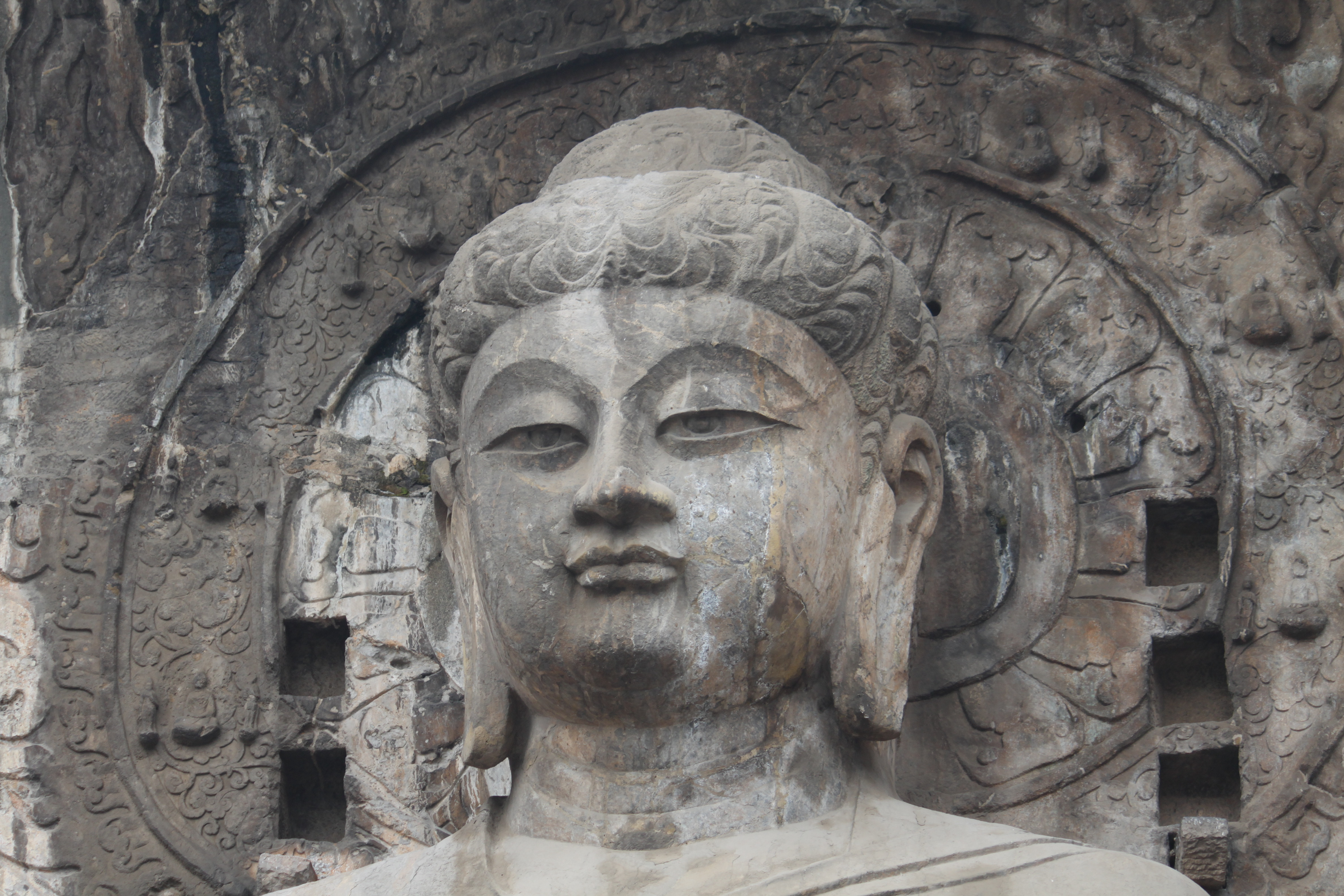
The features of Vairocana statue in Longmen Grottoes are supposedly based on Wu Zetian's image.

=== The Great Cloud Sutra ===
Wu Zetian used her political powers to harness from Buddhist practices a strategy to build sovereignty and legitimacy to her throne while establishing the Zhou dynasty in a society under Confucian and patriarchal ideals. One of the first steps she took to legitimize her ascension to the throne was to proclaim herself as the reincarnation of the Devi of Pure Radiance (Jingguang tiannü) through a series of prophecies. In 690, Wu sought out the support of the monk Xue Huaiyi, her reputed lover, and other nine orthodox Buddhist monks, to compose the apocryphal Commentary on the Meanings of the Prophecies About the Divine Sovereign in the Great Cloud Sutra (Dayunjing Shenhuang Shouji Yishu).

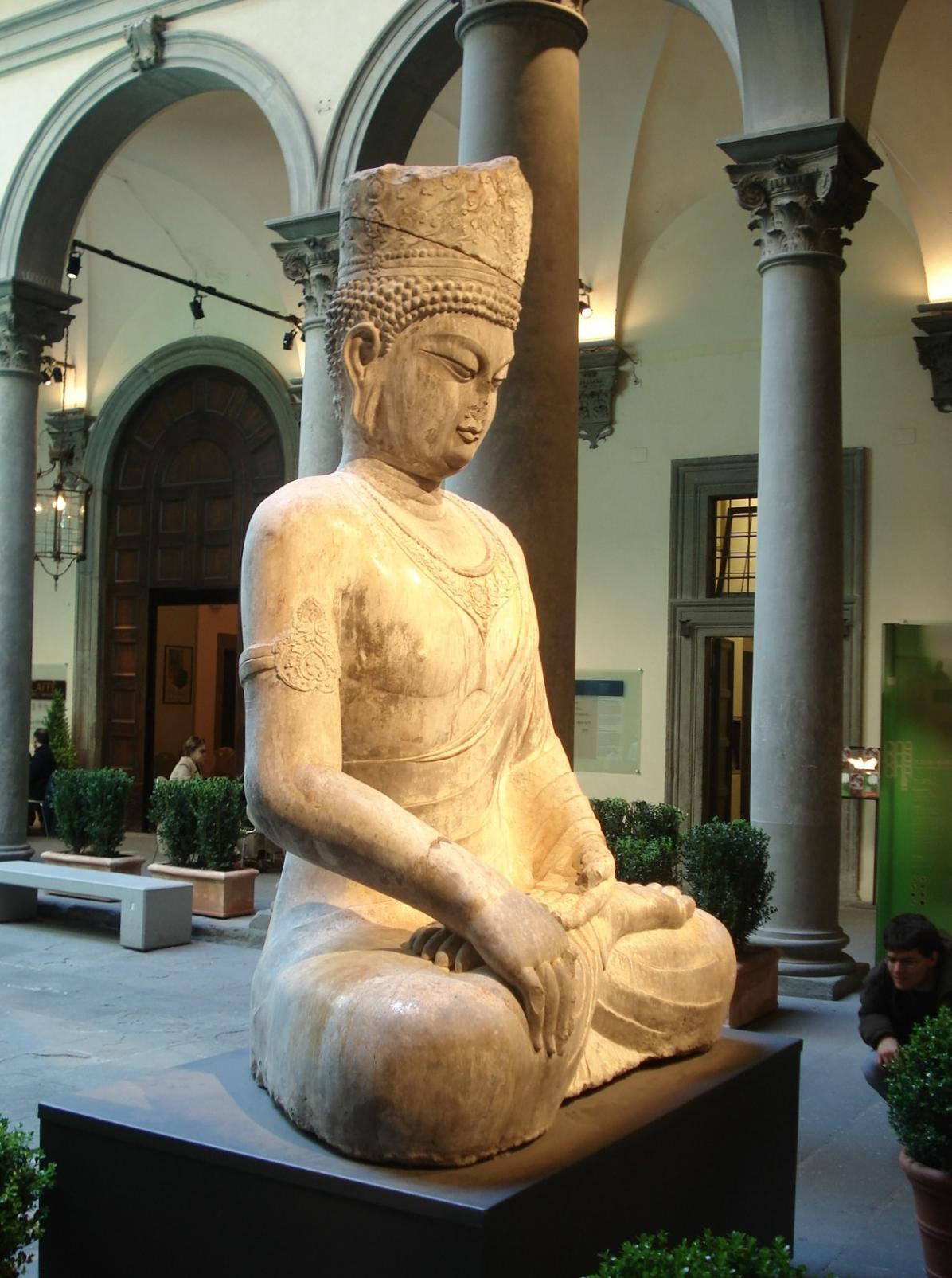
Maitreya statue from the reign of Wu Zetian

Translated from a late fourth-century version in Sanskrit to Chinese, the original Great Cloud Sutra (Dayunjing) accentuated in Wu's Commentary had fascicles describing a conversation between the Buddha and the Devi of Pure Radiance. In the sutra, the Buddha foretells to Jingguang that he would be a bodhisattva reincarnated in a woman's body in order to convert beings and rule over the territory of a country. Wu's Buddhist supporters meticulously propagated the Commentary "on the eve of her accession to the dragon throne" while seeking to justify the various events that led Wu to occupy the position of Huangdi as a female ruler and bodhisattva. Since gender in the Buddhist Devi worlds have no standard form, Wu later took a further step to transcend her gender limitations by identifying herself as the incarnation of two important male Buddhist divinities, Maitreya and Vairocana. Her narrative was intentionally crafted to persuade the Confucian establishment, circumvent the Five Impediments that restricted women from holding political and religious power, and gain public support.

=== Indian influences ===
According to William Dalrymple, Wu used Buddhist texts brought from Nalanda University by Xuanzang to legitimise her rule, and her reign resulted in a substantial importation of Indian ideas. Under her, Buddhism became a state religion, and slaughter of animals was strictly prohibited. Wu also implemented several Indian principles, such as those of the Ashokan edicts, into the governance of her empire, and had many Indians become part of the royal court, including faith healers and astrologers.

=== Sacrifice on Mount Tai ===
In relation to Daoism, there are records that point to Wu's participation in important religious rituals, such as the tou long on Mount Song, and feng and shan on Mount Tai. One of the most important rituals was performed in 666. When Emperor Gaozong offered sacrifices to the deities of heaven and earth, Wu, in an unprecedented action, offered sacrifices after him, with Princess Dowager Yan, mother of Gaozong's brother Li Zhen, Prince of Yue, offering sacrifices after her. Wu's procession of ladies up Mount Tai conspicuously linked Wu with the Chinese empire's most sacred traditional rites. Another important performance was made in 700, when Wu conducted the tou long Daoist expiatory rite. Her participation in the rituals had political as well as religious motives. These ceremonies strengthened Wu's political position and presented her as possessing the Mandate of Heaven.

== Literature ==
=== North Gate Scholars ===
Toward the end of Gaozong's life, Wu began engaging a number of mid-level officials who had literary talent, including Yuan Wanqing (元萬頃), Liu Yizhi, Fan Lübing, Miao Chuke (苗楚客), Zhou Simao (周思茂), and Han Chubin (韓楚賓), to write a number of works on her behalf, including the Biographies of Notable Women (列女傳), Guidelines for Imperial Subjects (臣軌), and New Teachings for Official Staff Members (百僚新誡). Collectively, they became known as the "North Gate Scholars" (北門學士), because they served inside the palace, which was north of the imperial government buildings, and Wu sought advice from them to divert the powers of the chancellors.

=== The "Twelve Suggestions" ===
On 28 January 675, Wu submitted 12 suggestions. Although the full proposal has not survived, at least seven of its suggestions are known. One was that the work of Laozi (whose family name was Li and to whom the Tang imperial clan traced its ancestry), Tao Te Ching, should be added to imperial university students' required reading. Another was that a three-year mourning period should be observed for a mother's death in all cases, not just in cases when the father was no longer alive. Emperor Gaozong praised her suggestions and adopted them.

=== Modified Chinese characters ===
First version of modified character of "Zhao"

Second version of modified character of "Zhao"

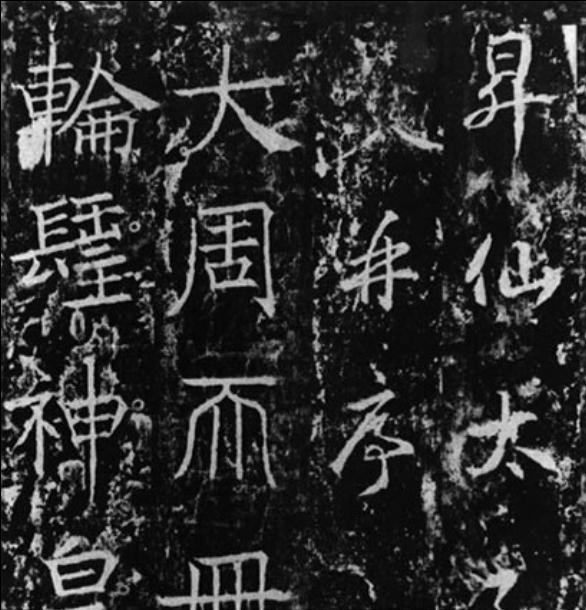
Text from Wu Zetian-era stele dedicated to Ji Jin (姬晉), the crown prince of King Ling of Zhou, recorded in legends as having risen to heaven to become a god; under the cosmology of Wu Zetian's reign, her lover Zhang Changzong was a reincarnation of Ji Jin; the text of the stele uses modified Chinese characters that she promulgated.

In 690, Wu's cousin's son Zong Qinke submitted a number of modified Chinese characters intended to showcase Wu's greatness. She adopted them, and took one of the modified characters, Zhao (曌), to be her formal name (i.e., the name by which the people would exercise naming taboo on). 曌 was made from two other characters: Ming (明) on top, meaning "light" or "clarity", and Kong (空) on the bottom, meaning "sky". The implication appeared to be that she would be like the light shining from the sky. (Zhao (照), meaning "shine", from which 曌 was derived, might have been her original name, but evidence of that is inconclusive.) Later that year, after successive petition drives started by the low-level official Fu Youyi began to occur in waves, asking her to take the throne, Emperor Ruizong offered to take the name of Wu as well. On 14 October 690, she approved the requests. She changed the state's name to Zhou on 16 October, claiming ancestry from the Zhou dynasty, and took the throne as Empress Regnant (with the title Empress Regnant Shengshen (聖神皇帝), literally "Divine and Sacred Emperor or Empress Regnant") on 19 October. Ruizong was deposed and made crown prince with the atypical title Huangsi (皇嗣). This thus interrupted the Tang dynasty, and Wu became the first (and only) woman to reign over China as empress regnant. (Note: During Emperor Taizong's reign, a female agrarian rebel leader named Chen Shuozhen (陳碩眞) had declared herself huangdi with the title Empress Wenjia (文佳皇帝, Wénjiā huángdì), but as Chen was quickly defeated and killed, she is typically not considered a true sovereign. See Zizhi Tongjian (1084), vol. 199. Earlier than that, during Northern Wei dynasty, Empress Dowager Hu, after her son Emperor Xiaoming's death, falsely declared Emperor Xiaoming's daughter to be a son and declared the daughter to be the new emperor, but almost immediately revealed that the child was in fact female, and thereafter declared Yuan Zhao, the young son of Emperor Xiaoming's cousin Yuan Baohui (元寶暉) emperor. See Zizhi Tongjian (1084), vol. 152. Emperor Xiaoming's daughter is also therefore not usually considered a true emperor.)

=== Poetry ===
Wu's court was a focus of literary creativity. Forty-six of Wu's poems are collected in the Complete Tang Poems and 61 essays under her name are recorded in the Quan Tangwen (Collected Tang Essays). Many of those writings serve political ends, but there is one poem in which she laments her mother after she died and expresses her despair at not being able to see her again.

During Wu's reign, the imperial court produced various works of which she was a sponsor, such as the anthology of her court's poetry known as the Zhuying ji (Collection of Precious Glories), which contained poems by Cui Rong, Li Jiao, Zhang Yue, and others, arranged according to the poets' rank at court. Among the literary developments that took place during Wu's time (and partly at her court) was the final stylistic development of the "new style" poetry of the regulated verse (jintishi), by the poetic pair Song Zhiwen and Shen Quanqi.

Wu also patronized scholars by founding an institute to produce the Collection of Biographies of Famous Women. The development of what is considered characteristic Tang poetry is traditionally ascribed to Chen Zi'ang, one of Wu's ministers.

=== Literary allusions ===
Literary allusions to Wu may carry several connotations: a woman who has inappropriately overstepped her bounds, the hypocrisy of preaching compassion while simultaneously engaging in a pattern of political corruption and vicious behavior. For many centuries, the establishment used Wu as an example of what can go wrong when a woman is in charge.

Mao Zedong's wife Jiang Qing rehabilitated Wu as part of a propaganda campaign to suggest she be considered as a successor to her ailing husband. Frank Dikotter asserted that Jiang Qing "had started to compare herself to the only empress ever to have ruled in Chinese history, namely Wu Zetian. Articles praising the sixth-century empress as a great unifier of the nation appeared in the press, even though she was popularly reviled as a ruthless, wicked ruler who had mercilessly crushed her opponents." However, Dikotter did not cite sources for his claim.

In his biography Wu, Jonathan Clements writes that these wildly differing uses of a historical figure often led to contradictory and even hysterical characterizations. Many alleged poisonings and other incidents, such as her daughter's premature death, may have rational explanations that have been twisted by later opponents.

== Evaluation ==
=== Quotes ===
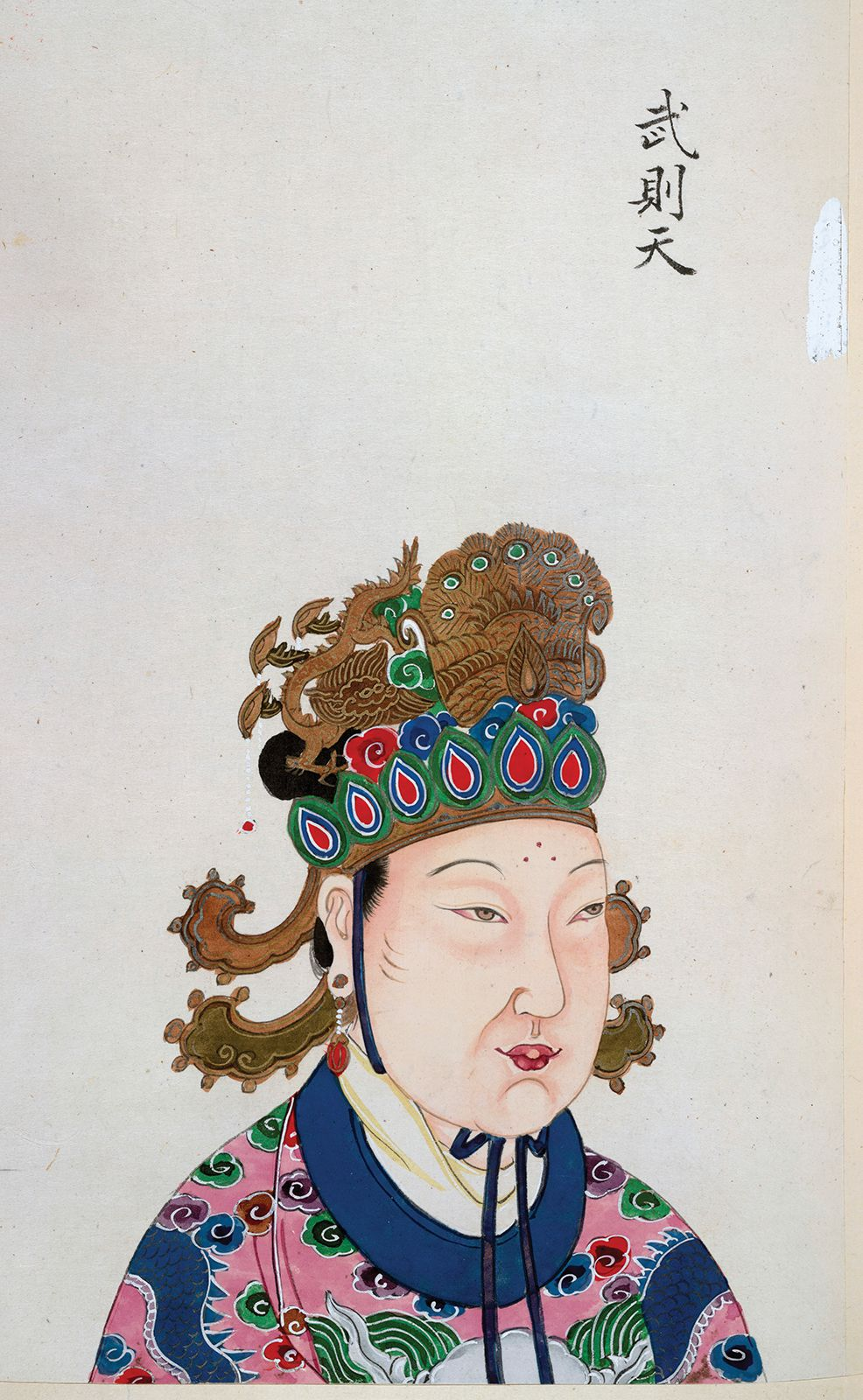
18th-century Qing dynasty illustration of Wu Zetian

The traditional Chinese historical view of Wu Zetian generally was mixed—admiring her for her abilities in governing the state, but vilifying her for her actions in seizing imperial power. Luo Binwang even wrote along these lines in a declaration during her lifetime, in support of Li Jingye's rebellion. Typical was a commentary by the Later Jin dynasty historian Liu Xu, the lead editor of the Old Book of Tang:

The year that Lady Wu declared herself regent, heroic individuals were all mournful of the unfortunate turn of events, worried that the dynasty would fall, and concerned that they could not repay the grace of the deceased emperor [i.e., Emperor Gaozong] and protect his sons. Soon thereafter, great accusations arose, and many innocent people were falsely accused and stuck their necks out in waiting for execution. Heaven and earth became like a huge cage, and even if one could escape it, where could he go? That was lamentable. In the past, the trick of covering the nose (Note: This was a reference to a story relayed in the Han Feizi. In the story, it was mentioned that the king of Qi gave a beautiful woman to King Huai of Chu as a gift, to be his concubine. King Huai's jealous wife Queen Zheng Xiu (鄭袖) told her, "The King loves you greatly, but dislikes your nose. If you cover your nose whenever you see him, you can ensure that he will continue to be loved by him." She accepted Queen Zheng's suggestion. When King Huai asked Queen Zheng, "Why does she cover her nose when she sees me?" Queen Zheng responded, "She often said that Your Majesty had a stench to you." King Huai, in anger, yelled, "Cut off her nose!") surprised the realm in its poisonousness, and the disaster of the human pig (Note: This is a reference to the torture that Emperor Gao of Han's wife Empress Lü Zhi carried out against Emperor Gao's favorite concubine Consort Qi after Emperor Gao's death, once Empress Lü became empress dowager—by cutting her limbs off, blinding her, deafening her, and referring to her as the human pig (人彘).) caused the entire state to mourn. In order to take over as empress, Empress Wu strangled her own infant daughter; her willingness to crush her own flesh and blood showed how great her viciousness and vile nature was, although this is nothing more than what jealous individuals and evil women might do. However, she accepted the words of righteousness and honored the upright. Although she was like a hen that crowed, she eventually returned the rightful rule to her son. She quickly dispelled the accusation against Wei Yuanzhong, comforted Di Renjie with kind words, respected the will of the times and suppressed her favorites, and listened to honest words and ended the terror of the secret police officials. This was good, this was good.

Some of the diversity in terms of points of agreement and even outright divergences in modern evaluations of Wu can be seen in the following quotes by modern non-Chinese authors:

Wu Zetian (690–705) was an extraordinary woman, attractive, exceptionally gifted, politically astute and an excellent judge of men. With single minded determination, she overcame the opposition of the Confucian establishment through her own efforts, unique among palace women by not using her own family. Her rise to power was steeped in blood.

To the horror of traditional Chinese historians, all members of the shih class, the continued success of the T'ang was in large measure due to an ex-concubine who finally usurped the throne itself. ... Though she was ruthless towards her enemies, the period of her ascendency was a good one for China. Government was sound, no rebellions occurred, abuses in the army and administration were stamped out and Korea was annexed, an achievement no previous Chinese had ever managed.

China's only woman ruler, Empress Wu was a remarkably skilled and able politician, but her murderous and illicit methods of maintaining power gave her a bad reputation among male bureaucrats. It also fostered overstaffing and many kinds of corruption.

=== Confucian viewpoints ===
Wu Zetian's rise and reign was criticized harshly by Confucian historians like Liu Xu and Yuan Shu, But, some of those had praises for Wu Zetian like Liu Xu (in Quotes section), Sima Guang

In the early period of the Tang dynasty, because all the emperors were her direct descendants, Wu was evaluated favorably. But commentary in subsequent periods, especially the book Zizhi Tongjian compiled by Sima Guang, harshly criticized her. By the period of Southern Song dynasty, when Neo-Confucianism was firmly established as China's mainstream political ideology, it determined the evaluation of Wu.

== Era names ==
Zhou dynasty (690–705): Convention: use personal name
| Temple names | Family name and first name | Period of reign | Era names and their associated dates |
| None | Wǔ Zhào(武曌) | 690–705 | Tiānshòu (天授): 16 October 690 – 21 April 692 (18 months); Rúyì (如意): 22 April – 22 October 692 (6 months); Chángshòu (長壽): 23 October 692 – 8 June 694 (19 1/2 months); Yánzài (延載): 9 June 694 – 21 January 695 (7 1/2 months); Zhèngshèng (證聖): 22 January – 21 October 695 (9 months); Tiāncèwànsuì (天冊萬歲): 22 October 695 – 19 January 696 (3 months); Wànsuìdēngfēng (萬歲登封): 20 January – 21 April 696 (3 months); Wànsuìtōngtiān (萬歲通天): 22 April 696 – 28 September 697 (17 months); Shéngōng (神功): 29 September – 19 December 697 (2 1/2 months); Shènglì (聖曆): 20 December 697 – 26 May 700 (29 months); Jiǔshì (久視): 27 May 700 – 14 February 701 (8 1/2 months); Dàzú (大足): 15 February – 25 November 701 (9 1/2 months); Cháng'ān (長安): 26 November 701 – 29 January 705 (38 months); Shénlóng (神龍): 30 January – 23 February 705 (the Zhou dynasty was abolished and the Tang dynasty was restored, but the Shenlong era continued to be used by Emperor Zhongzong until 707) |

== Chancellors during reign ==
Wu Zetian had many chancellors during her reign as monarch of her self-proclaimed Zhou dynasty, many of them notable in their own right. (For full list see List of chancellors of Wu Zetian).

== See also ==
- Chinese characters of Empress Wu
- Imperial consorts of Tang China
- Li Chong (Tang dynasty)
- Longmen Grottoes
- Qianling Mausoleum
- Wu Chengsi
- Wu Sansi
- Yang Zhirou
- Zhuying ji
- Princess Taiping
- Tang dynasty
- Women in Tang China
- List of Buddha claimants
- Cixi

== Notes ==
Wu Zetian House of Wu Born: 17 February 624 Died: 16 December 705
Regnal titles
| New title Zhou dynasty proclaimed | Empress regnant of the Zhou dynasty 690–705 | Tang dynasty restored |
| Preceded by Emperor Ruizong of Tang | Empress regnant of China; 690–705 | Succeeded by Emperor Zhongzong of Tang |
Chinese royalty
| Preceded by Empress Wang | Empress consort of the Tang dynasty 655–683 | Succeeded by Empress Wei |
Honorary titles
| Vacant Title last held by Emperor Gaozu of Tang | Retired empress regnant of China; 705 | Vacant Title next held by Emperor Ruizong of Tang |
