= Zong Qinke =

Chinese chancellor of the Tang dynasty

Zong Qinke (宗秦客) (died 691?) was an official of the Chinese Tang dynasty and Wu Zetian's Zhou dynasty, serving briefly as chancellor during Wu Zetian's reign. Among other things, he is particularly noted for his role in developing certain innovative Chinese characters of Empress Wu; that is, as part of Wu Zetian's acquisition and consolidation of power by means of literature and religious practices, Zong Qinke worked on developing modified characters to replace the regular forms of characters with particular symbolic importance with newly invented characters intended to support this process, such as the characters for her personal name (Zhao) and the characters for "Heaven" (tian) and "Earth" (dì).

It is not known when Zong Qinke was born, but it is known that he was from Hedong (河東, in modern Yuncheng, Shanxi), and that his mother was a cousin of Wu Zetian's. As of 689, when Wu Zetian was empress dowager and regent over her son Emperor Ruizong, Zong was Fengge Shilang (鳳閣侍郎), the deputy head of the legislative bureau of government (鳳閣, Fengge), and he submitted 12 new characters to substitute for common characters such as Tian (天, heaven) and Di (地, earth). Around the new year 690, she adopted and promulgated the new characters, which were used until at least 705.

Later in 690, Empress Dowager Wu had Emperor Ruizong yield the throne to her, establishing Zhou as its "emperor" and interrupting Tang. She made Zong acting Neishi (內史) -- the head of the legislative bureau and a post considered one for a chancellor. About a month later, however, on September 28, 690, Zong was accused of corruption, and his younger brother Zong Chuke was accused of rape and corruption as well. Wu Zetian stripped Zong Qinke of his chancellor authorities and demoted him to be the sheriff of Zunhua County (遵化, in modern Qinzhou, Guangxi), and Zong Chuke and another brother, Zong Jinqing (宗晉卿), were also exiled to the same region. Zong Qinke died about a year after his exile.

== Notes and references ==
- Old Book of Tang, vol. 92.
- New Book of Tang, vol. 109.
- Zizhi Tongjian, vol. 204.
