= Cui Rong =

Chinese poet and politician (653–706)

Cui Rong (Chinese: 崔融; pinyin: Cuī Róng, 653–706) was a Chinese poet and politician of the Tang dynasty and Wu Zhou dynasty. His poetry style was typical of Tang poetry. He is famous for editing an anthology of poetry of the court of Wu Zetian: a work known as the Collection of Precious Glories (Zhuying ji), which contained poems by himself, Li Jiao (644–713), Zhang Yue (677–731), and others. The original work was long thought to be completely lost, however fragments constituting about one-fifth of the original were found among the manuscripts found at Dunhuang, with fifty-five poems by thirteen men. One notable feature of this anthology is that Cui Rong arranged the work in descending order of official rank of the included poets; which, among other things, highlights the nature of early Tang poetry as a type of court poetry.

== See also ==
- Classical Chinese poetry
- Li Jiao
- Princess Taiping
- Wang Fangqing
- Xue Yuanchao
- Zhuying ji
