= Zhuying ji =

Zhuying ji (Chinese: 珠英集), also known as the Collection of Precious Glories, is a collection of Chinese poetry by Cui Rong, first published in the Wu Zhou dynasty. The book contains poems by Cui Rong (653–706), Li Jiao (644–713), Zhang Yue (677–731), and others. The original work was long thought to be completely lost, however fragments constituting about one-fifth of the original have been found among the Dunhuang manuscripts, with fifty-five poems by thirteen men. One notable feature of this anthology is that Cui Rong arranged the work in descending order of official rank of the included poets; which, among other things, underlines the nature of early Tang poetry as a type of poetry associated with the imperial courts and palaces.

== See also ==
- Classical Chinese poetry
- Six Dynasties poetry
- Tang poetry

== Notes and references ==
- Yu, Pauline (2002). "Chinese Poetry and Its Institutions", in Hsiang Lectures on Chinese Poetry, Volume 2, Grace S. Fong, editor. Montreal: Center for East Asian Research, McGill University.
