= Chinese characters of Empress Wu =

Alternative Hanzi created by Wu Zhao

The Chinese characters of Empress Wu, or the Zetian characters (Chinese: 則天文字; pinyin: Zétiān wénzì), are Chinese characters introduced by Empress Wu Zetian, the only empress regnant in the history of China, in order to demonstrate her power. The characters were not created by the Empress herself, but were suggested by an official named Zong Qinke, the son of one of her cousins, in December, 689 AD. The number of characters varies between 12, 17, 19, or 30. Her subjects were forced to use them during her reign, but they fell into disuse immediately after her death, so they help to determine dates of printed materials.

A few of the surviving characters are preserved in the written histories of Wu Zetian, and a few have found themselves incorporated into modern-day computer standards, classified as either variant or dialect-specific characters.

The form of the characters varies depending on where they are printed. For instance, Empress Wu's own name 照 zhào was replaced with one of two new characters created through her: 瞾 or 曌; looking in the Kangxi Dictionary, one finds the description of the former, having two 目 ("eye") characters, being the proper character, rather than 明 míng ("bright").

== History ==
Wu was China's only empress, and she exercised her power by introducing many reforms. In addition to changing the way people dressed, she wanted to change the words people used.

Empress Wu's written reforms resulted in new characters, which were not created from scratch, but borrowed elements of older characters.

Although the characters quickly fell into disuse after the end of Wu's reign, they were recorded in large dictionaries and a few have occasionally appeared as variant characters used in proper names. For instance, 圀 ('country', 'state') is used to write the name of daimyō Tokugawa Mitsukuni (徳川 光圀) in kanji. In this context, the character is given the kun'yomi reading kuni as a variant of orthodox characters 国/國 (in shinjitai and kyūjitai, respectively).

Anecdotes about the reign of Empress Wu and the creation of these characters can be read in the Old Book of Tang.

== Examples ==
Original character	Pinyin and meaning	New character	Large version	Unicode	Explanation of meaning
照	zhào "shine, illuminate, see exactly "	曌	Zetian character 照	U+66CC	The empress's name, 照, here comprises ⿱⿰日月空, or "the sun and the moon in the sky above". The Moon and Sun symbolize the harmony of yin and yang.
照	zhào "shine, illuminate, see exactly "	瞾	Zetian variant of above character	U+77BE	The above character is sometimes written this way, as seen in the Kangxi dictionary. Some believe this version came about as a result of a naming taboo.
天	tiān "Providence, heaven"	𠑺	First version of the Zetian character replacing 天	U+2047A	This character is based on the seal-script version of 天.
天	tiān "Providence, heaven"	𠀑	Second version of the Zetian character replacing 天	U+20011	Version of the above character in which some lines are connected, as in handwritten script.
地	dì "earth"	埊	Zetian version of the character 地	U+57CA	The character for "Earth" is composed of a mountain, a water, and earth.
日	rì "sun, day"	𡆠	Zetian version of 日	U+211A0	Said to represent the three-legged crow Sun deity of Chinese mythology.
月	yuè "moon, month"	囝	Zetian version of 月	U+56DD	Said to represent the rabbit or toad-shaped Moon.
月	yuè "moon, month"	𠥱	Second version of the character 月	U+20971	Also said to represent the rabbit or toad-shaped Moon.
星	xīng "star"	〇	The Zetian version of 星	U+3007	An empty circle, used to represent the word for 'star', now used in Modern Chinese as a Chinese numeral, representing "zero" (零)
君	jūn "monarch"	𠺞	则天文字之“君”正字	U+20E9E	Composed of the characters 天大吉, which symbolizes that the world is in a state of great fortune, due to the empress
君	jūn "monarch"	𠁈	则天文字之“君”一	U+20048	More commonly used variant of the above due to being easier to write.
君	jūn "monarch"	𠱰	则天文字之“君”二	U+20C70	
臣	chén "vassal of the monarch"	𢘑	则天文字之“臣”	U+22611	"firstly loyalty" (一忠), represents the loyalty that a subject should have
除	chú "eliminate, to be assigned to position"	𠀺	则天文字之“除”	U+2003A	天兴, represents the fact that the Heaven has allowed the empress to rise up in order to get rid of the old, eradicate all tyranny and misgovernment and create a new world
載	zài "forever, countless"	𡕀	则天文字之“载”一	U+21540	
載	zài "forever, countless"	𠧋	则天文字之“载”二	U+209CB	
初	chū "start, found"	𡔈	则天文字之“初”	U+21508	
年	nián "year"	𠡦	則则天文字之“年”一	U+20866	千千万万 (lit. by the thousands and tens of thousands), symbolizing that the empress's empire will last thousands of years. The 力 character is likely a variant of 卐, which means the same as 万: ten thousand.
年	nián "year"	𠦚	則则天文字之“年”二	U+2099A	Simplification of the above, with one less stroke.
正	zhèng "fair, right"	𠙺	則则天文字之“正"	U+2067A	
人	rén "human, people"	𤯔	The Zetian version of 人	U+24BD4	Consisting of the Chinese numeral "one" (一) above the character for "life" (生), the character carries a meaning that everyone only lives once.
國	guó "nation, country, nation-state"	圀	则天文字之“国”	U+5700	Consisting of the Chinese numeral "eight" (八), above the character for "direction" (方), both within a "boundary" (囗).

== See also ==
- A Book from the Sky
- Claudian letters
