= Li Dan =

Li Dan or Lidan may refer to:

== People ==
- Laozi (fl. 6th century BC), philosopher and founder of Taoism, one of his posthumous names being Li Dan
- An Indian Brahmin who died in Xi'an in 564 CE, known for the Tomb of Li Dan
- Emperor Ruizong of Tang (662–716), 2-time Tang emperor, known as Li Dan from 678 to 690
- Li Siyuan (867–933), Later Tang emperor, known as Li Dan from 927 to 933
- Li Dan (magnate) (died 1625), Chinese merchant and political figure
- Li Dan (sport shooter) (born 1962), Chinese sport shooter
- Li Dan (activist) (born 1978), Chinese HIV/AIDS activist
- Li Dan (speed skater) (born 1986), female Chinese speed skater (Olympian 2014)
- Li Dan (speed skater) (born 1994), female Chinese speed skater (Olympian 2018)
- Li Dan (gymnast) (born 1988), female Chinese trampoline gymnast
- Li Dan (runner) (born 1995), Chinese long-distance runner
- Li Tan (died 757), Tang prince
- Li Dan (stand-up comedian) (born 1989)

== Places ==
- Lidan River, a Swedish river
- Lidan, Li County (澧澹街道), a subdistrict in Li County, Hunan, China

== See also ==
- Daniel Little, American philosopher and professor who publishes in China under his Chinese name "Li Dan"
